

465001–465100 

|-bgcolor=#fefefe
| 465001 ||  || — || February 25, 2006 || Kitt Peak || Spacewatch || — || align=right data-sort-value="0.68" | 680 m || 
|-id=002 bgcolor=#d6d6d6
| 465002 ||  || — || January 30, 2006 || Kitt Peak || Spacewatch || — || align=right | 1.9 km || 
|-id=003 bgcolor=#fefefe
| 465003 ||  || — || February 25, 2006 || Kitt Peak || Spacewatch || — || align=right data-sort-value="0.57" | 570 m || 
|-id=004 bgcolor=#fefefe
| 465004 ||  || — || March 4, 2006 || Kitt Peak || Spacewatch || — || align=right data-sort-value="0.65" | 650 m || 
|-id=005 bgcolor=#d6d6d6
| 465005 ||  || — || February 25, 2006 || Kitt Peak || Spacewatch || TRE || align=right | 3.3 km || 
|-id=006 bgcolor=#d6d6d6
| 465006 ||  || — || March 26, 2006 || Mount Lemmon || Mount Lemmon Survey || — || align=right | 2.2 km || 
|-id=007 bgcolor=#fefefe
| 465007 ||  || — || March 26, 2006 || Mount Lemmon || Mount Lemmon Survey || — || align=right data-sort-value="0.65" | 650 m || 
|-id=008 bgcolor=#fefefe
| 465008 ||  || — || April 2, 2006 || Kitt Peak || Spacewatch || — || align=right data-sort-value="0.62" | 620 m || 
|-id=009 bgcolor=#fefefe
| 465009 ||  || — || April 7, 2006 || Kitt Peak || Spacewatch || — || align=right data-sort-value="0.72" | 720 m || 
|-id=010 bgcolor=#fefefe
| 465010 ||  || — || April 8, 2006 || Kitt Peak || Spacewatch || — || align=right data-sort-value="0.79" | 790 m || 
|-id=011 bgcolor=#fefefe
| 465011 ||  || — || April 19, 2006 || Mount Lemmon || Mount Lemmon Survey || — || align=right data-sort-value="0.75" | 750 m || 
|-id=012 bgcolor=#d6d6d6
| 465012 ||  || — || April 21, 2006 || Kitt Peak || Spacewatch || EOS || align=right | 1.6 km || 
|-id=013 bgcolor=#d6d6d6
| 465013 ||  || — || April 24, 2006 || Kitt Peak || Spacewatch || — || align=right | 2.6 km || 
|-id=014 bgcolor=#d6d6d6
| 465014 ||  || — || April 25, 2006 || Kitt Peak || Spacewatch || — || align=right | 2.3 km || 
|-id=015 bgcolor=#fefefe
| 465015 ||  || — || April 26, 2006 || Kitt Peak || Spacewatch || — || align=right data-sort-value="0.59" | 590 m || 
|-id=016 bgcolor=#d6d6d6
| 465016 ||  || — || April 30, 2006 || Kitt Peak || Spacewatch || — || align=right | 2.3 km || 
|-id=017 bgcolor=#d6d6d6
| 465017 ||  || — || May 1, 2006 || Kitt Peak || Spacewatch || EOS || align=right | 1.7 km || 
|-id=018 bgcolor=#d6d6d6
| 465018 ||  || — || April 21, 2006 || Kitt Peak || Spacewatch || LIX || align=right | 3.6 km || 
|-id=019 bgcolor=#d6d6d6
| 465019 ||  || — || May 2, 2006 || Kitt Peak || Spacewatch || EOS || align=right | 1.9 km || 
|-id=020 bgcolor=#d6d6d6
| 465020 ||  || — || April 21, 2006 || Kitt Peak || Spacewatch || — || align=right | 3.3 km || 
|-id=021 bgcolor=#fefefe
| 465021 ||  || — || May 4, 2006 || Kitt Peak || Spacewatch || H || align=right data-sort-value="0.65" | 650 m || 
|-id=022 bgcolor=#fefefe
| 465022 ||  || — || May 6, 2006 || Mount Lemmon || Mount Lemmon Survey || — || align=right data-sort-value="0.62" | 620 m || 
|-id=023 bgcolor=#d6d6d6
| 465023 ||  || — || April 29, 2006 || Kitt Peak || Spacewatch || — || align=right | 3.5 km || 
|-id=024 bgcolor=#fefefe
| 465024 ||  || — || May 20, 2006 || Kitt Peak || Spacewatch || — || align=right data-sort-value="0.52" | 520 m || 
|-id=025 bgcolor=#d6d6d6
| 465025 ||  || — || May 20, 2006 || Kitt Peak || Spacewatch || — || align=right | 3.0 km || 
|-id=026 bgcolor=#fefefe
| 465026 ||  || — || April 24, 2006 || Kitt Peak || Spacewatch || — || align=right data-sort-value="0.60" | 600 m || 
|-id=027 bgcolor=#d6d6d6
| 465027 ||  || — || April 26, 2006 || Mount Lemmon || Mount Lemmon Survey || — || align=right | 2.2 km || 
|-id=028 bgcolor=#d6d6d6
| 465028 ||  || — || April 30, 2006 || Kitt Peak || Spacewatch || — || align=right | 3.5 km || 
|-id=029 bgcolor=#fefefe
| 465029 ||  || — || May 22, 2006 || Kitt Peak || Spacewatch || — || align=right data-sort-value="0.75" | 750 m || 
|-id=030 bgcolor=#d6d6d6
| 465030 ||  || — || May 22, 2006 || Kitt Peak || Spacewatch || — || align=right | 2.5 km || 
|-id=031 bgcolor=#d6d6d6
| 465031 ||  || — || May 7, 2006 || Mount Lemmon || Mount Lemmon Survey || — || align=right | 2.2 km || 
|-id=032 bgcolor=#fefefe
| 465032 ||  || — || May 1, 2006 || Kitt Peak || Spacewatch || — || align=right data-sort-value="0.56" | 560 m || 
|-id=033 bgcolor=#fefefe
| 465033 ||  || — || June 21, 2006 || Palomar || NEAT || — || align=right data-sort-value="0.77" | 770 m || 
|-id=034 bgcolor=#d6d6d6
| 465034 ||  || — || May 30, 2006 || Mount Lemmon || Mount Lemmon Survey || — || align=right | 3.1 km || 
|-id=035 bgcolor=#d6d6d6
| 465035 ||  || — || May 26, 2006 || Mount Lemmon || Mount Lemmon Survey || — || align=right | 2.9 km || 
|-id=036 bgcolor=#d6d6d6
| 465036 Tatm ||  ||  || August 16, 2006 || Lulin Observatory || C.-S. Lin, Q.-z. Ye || — || align=right | 3.4 km || 
|-id=037 bgcolor=#fefefe
| 465037 ||  || — || August 20, 2006 || Palomar || NEAT || — || align=right data-sort-value="0.80" | 800 m || 
|-id=038 bgcolor=#fefefe
| 465038 ||  || — || August 19, 2006 || Palomar || NEAT || — || align=right data-sort-value="0.89" | 890 m || 
|-id=039 bgcolor=#fefefe
| 465039 ||  || — || August 22, 2006 || Palomar || NEAT || — || align=right data-sort-value="0.84" | 840 m || 
|-id=040 bgcolor=#FA8072
| 465040 ||  || — || August 23, 2006 || Socorro || LINEAR || — || align=right data-sort-value="0.64" | 640 m || 
|-id=041 bgcolor=#fefefe
| 465041 ||  || — || August 25, 2006 || Socorro || LINEAR || — || align=right | 1.6 km || 
|-id=042 bgcolor=#fefefe
| 465042 ||  || — || August 21, 2006 || Kitt Peak || Spacewatch || — || align=right data-sort-value="0.68" | 680 m || 
|-id=043 bgcolor=#fefefe
| 465043 ||  || — || August 24, 2006 || Palomar || NEAT || — || align=right data-sort-value="0.66" | 660 m || 
|-id=044 bgcolor=#d6d6d6
| 465044 ||  || — || August 28, 2006 || Catalina || CSS || — || align=right | 2.9 km || 
|-id=045 bgcolor=#fefefe
| 465045 ||  || — || August 27, 2006 || Anderson Mesa || LONEOS || — || align=right data-sort-value="0.74" | 740 m || 
|-id=046 bgcolor=#fefefe
| 465046 ||  || — || August 18, 2006 || Kitt Peak || Spacewatch || — || align=right data-sort-value="0.69" | 690 m || 
|-id=047 bgcolor=#fefefe
| 465047 ||  || — || August 27, 2006 || Anderson Mesa || LONEOS || — || align=right data-sort-value="0.72" | 720 m || 
|-id=048 bgcolor=#fefefe
| 465048 ||  || — || September 14, 2006 || Kitt Peak || Spacewatch || MASfast? || align=right data-sort-value="0.78" | 780 m || 
|-id=049 bgcolor=#fefefe
| 465049 ||  || — || August 30, 2006 || Anderson Mesa || LONEOS || H || align=right data-sort-value="0.73" | 730 m || 
|-id=050 bgcolor=#fefefe
| 465050 ||  || — || September 15, 2006 || Kitt Peak || Spacewatch || — || align=right data-sort-value="0.82" | 820 m || 
|-id=051 bgcolor=#fefefe
| 465051 ||  || — || September 15, 2006 || Kitt Peak || Spacewatch || — || align=right data-sort-value="0.62" | 620 m || 
|-id=052 bgcolor=#fefefe
| 465052 ||  || — || September 15, 2006 || Kitt Peak || Spacewatch || — || align=right data-sort-value="0.79" | 790 m || 
|-id=053 bgcolor=#d6d6d6
| 465053 ||  || — || September 15, 2006 || Kitt Peak || Spacewatch || — || align=right | 2.8 km || 
|-id=054 bgcolor=#d6d6d6
| 465054 ||  || — || September 16, 2006 || Catalina || CSS || Tj (2.99) || align=right | 4.7 km || 
|-id=055 bgcolor=#fefefe
| 465055 ||  || — || September 16, 2006 || Kitt Peak || Spacewatch || — || align=right data-sort-value="0.68" | 680 m || 
|-id=056 bgcolor=#d6d6d6
| 465056 ||  || — || August 29, 2006 || Anderson Mesa || LONEOS || Tj (2.98) || align=right | 3.3 km || 
|-id=057 bgcolor=#d6d6d6
| 465057 ||  || — || September 17, 2006 || Kitt Peak || Spacewatch || — || align=right | 2.9 km || 
|-id=058 bgcolor=#fefefe
| 465058 ||  || — || September 17, 2006 || Anderson Mesa || LONEOS || — || align=right data-sort-value="0.82" | 820 m || 
|-id=059 bgcolor=#fefefe
| 465059 ||  || — || September 18, 2006 || Catalina || CSS || — || align=right data-sort-value="0.67" | 670 m || 
|-id=060 bgcolor=#fefefe
| 465060 ||  || — || July 21, 2006 || Mount Lemmon || Mount Lemmon Survey || NYS || align=right data-sort-value="0.59" | 590 m || 
|-id=061 bgcolor=#fefefe
| 465061 ||  || — || September 18, 2006 || Catalina || CSS || — || align=right data-sort-value="0.94" | 940 m || 
|-id=062 bgcolor=#fefefe
| 465062 ||  || — || September 19, 2006 || Kitt Peak || Spacewatch || — || align=right data-sort-value="0.71" | 710 m || 
|-id=063 bgcolor=#fefefe
| 465063 ||  || — || July 21, 2006 || Mount Lemmon || Mount Lemmon Survey || — || align=right data-sort-value="0.77" | 770 m || 
|-id=064 bgcolor=#fefefe
| 465064 ||  || — || September 18, 2006 || Kitt Peak || Spacewatch || MAS || align=right data-sort-value="0.71" | 710 m || 
|-id=065 bgcolor=#d6d6d6
| 465065 ||  || — || September 19, 2006 || Kitt Peak || Spacewatch || — || align=right | 2.8 km || 
|-id=066 bgcolor=#fefefe
| 465066 ||  || — || September 22, 2006 || Catalina || CSS || — || align=right data-sort-value="0.98" | 980 m || 
|-id=067 bgcolor=#fefefe
| 465067 ||  || — || September 19, 2006 || Catalina || CSS || — || align=right | 1.2 km || 
|-id=068 bgcolor=#d6d6d6
| 465068 ||  || — || September 17, 2006 || Kitt Peak || Spacewatch || — || align=right | 2.8 km || 
|-id=069 bgcolor=#fefefe
| 465069 ||  || — || September 19, 2006 || Catalina || CSS || — || align=right | 1.1 km || 
|-id=070 bgcolor=#fefefe
| 465070 ||  || — || September 18, 2006 || Kitt Peak || Spacewatch || — || align=right data-sort-value="0.66" | 660 m || 
|-id=071 bgcolor=#d6d6d6
| 465071 ||  || — || September 16, 2006 || Kitt Peak || Spacewatch || VER || align=right | 2.4 km || 
|-id=072 bgcolor=#d6d6d6
| 465072 ||  || — || September 26, 2006 || Catalina || CSS || Tj (2.99) || align=right | 6.0 km || 
|-id=073 bgcolor=#fefefe
| 465073 ||  || — || September 28, 2006 || Kitt Peak || Spacewatch || — || align=right data-sort-value="0.63" | 630 m || 
|-id=074 bgcolor=#fefefe
| 465074 ||  || — || September 30, 2006 || Catalina || CSS || — || align=right data-sort-value="0.84" | 840 m || 
|-id=075 bgcolor=#fefefe
| 465075 ||  || — || September 30, 2006 || Catalina || CSS || NYS || align=right data-sort-value="0.77" | 770 m || 
|-id=076 bgcolor=#fefefe
| 465076 ||  || — || September 30, 2006 || Catalina || CSS || — || align=right data-sort-value="0.71" | 710 m || 
|-id=077 bgcolor=#d6d6d6
| 465077 ||  || — || September 27, 2006 || Catalina || CSS || Tj (2.99) || align=right | 4.6 km || 
|-id=078 bgcolor=#fefefe
| 465078 ||  || — || December 19, 2003 || Kitt Peak || Spacewatch || NYS || align=right data-sort-value="0.67" | 670 m || 
|-id=079 bgcolor=#fefefe
| 465079 ||  || — || October 12, 2006 || Kitt Peak || Spacewatch || — || align=right | 1.0 km || 
|-id=080 bgcolor=#fefefe
| 465080 ||  || — || October 13, 2006 || Kitt Peak || Spacewatch || — || align=right data-sort-value="0.77" | 770 m || 
|-id=081 bgcolor=#E9E9E9
| 465081 ||  || — || October 15, 2006 || Kitt Peak || Spacewatch || — || align=right data-sort-value="0.83" | 830 m || 
|-id=082 bgcolor=#E9E9E9
| 465082 ||  || — || October 15, 2006 || Kitt Peak || Spacewatch || — || align=right data-sort-value="0.84" | 840 m || 
|-id=083 bgcolor=#fefefe
| 465083 ||  || — || October 4, 2006 || Mount Lemmon || Mount Lemmon Survey || — || align=right data-sort-value="0.85" | 850 m || 
|-id=084 bgcolor=#fefefe
| 465084 ||  || — || October 12, 2006 || Kitt Peak || Spacewatch || — || align=right data-sort-value="0.74" | 740 m || 
|-id=085 bgcolor=#E9E9E9
| 465085 ||  || — || September 30, 2006 || Mount Lemmon || Mount Lemmon Survey || — || align=right data-sort-value="0.89" | 890 m || 
|-id=086 bgcolor=#E9E9E9
| 465086 ||  || — || October 16, 2006 || Kitt Peak || Spacewatch || — || align=right data-sort-value="0.83" | 830 m || 
|-id=087 bgcolor=#fefefe
| 465087 ||  || — || September 28, 2006 || Mount Lemmon || Mount Lemmon Survey || NYS || align=right data-sort-value="0.56" | 560 m || 
|-id=088 bgcolor=#fefefe
| 465088 ||  || — || October 18, 2006 || Kitt Peak || Spacewatch || — || align=right data-sort-value="0.78" | 780 m || 
|-id=089 bgcolor=#d6d6d6
| 465089 ||  || — || October 19, 2006 || Kitt Peak || Spacewatch || 7:4 || align=right | 2.8 km || 
|-id=090 bgcolor=#fefefe
| 465090 ||  || — || October 17, 2006 || Kitt Peak || Spacewatch || V || align=right data-sort-value="0.56" | 560 m || 
|-id=091 bgcolor=#fefefe
| 465091 ||  || — || October 17, 2006 || Mount Lemmon || Mount Lemmon Survey || — || align=right data-sort-value="0.70" | 700 m || 
|-id=092 bgcolor=#fefefe
| 465092 ||  || — || October 17, 2006 || Kitt Peak || Spacewatch || — || align=right data-sort-value="0.85" | 850 m || 
|-id=093 bgcolor=#fefefe
| 465093 ||  || — || September 30, 2006 || Mount Lemmon || Mount Lemmon Survey || MAS || align=right data-sort-value="0.69" | 690 m || 
|-id=094 bgcolor=#E9E9E9
| 465094 ||  || — || October 19, 2006 || Kitt Peak || Spacewatch || — || align=right data-sort-value="0.69" | 690 m || 
|-id=095 bgcolor=#fefefe
| 465095 ||  || — || October 19, 2006 || Kitt Peak || Spacewatch || — || align=right data-sort-value="0.98" | 980 m || 
|-id=096 bgcolor=#fefefe
| 465096 ||  || — || September 22, 2006 || Anderson Mesa || LONEOS || — || align=right data-sort-value="0.87" | 870 m || 
|-id=097 bgcolor=#E9E9E9
| 465097 ||  || — || August 28, 2006 || Catalina || CSS || — || align=right | 1.7 km || 
|-id=098 bgcolor=#FFC2E0
| 465098 ||  || — || October 31, 2006 || Catalina || CSS || AMO +1km || align=right | 2.1 km || 
|-id=099 bgcolor=#fefefe
| 465099 ||  || — || October 23, 2006 || Kitt Peak || Spacewatch || — || align=right data-sort-value="0.72" | 720 m || 
|-id=100 bgcolor=#fefefe
| 465100 ||  || — || October 27, 2006 || Mount Lemmon || Mount Lemmon Survey || H || align=right data-sort-value="0.60" | 600 m || 
|}

465101–465200 

|-bgcolor=#fefefe
| 465101 ||  || — || October 27, 2006 || Mount Lemmon || Mount Lemmon Survey || — || align=right data-sort-value="0.76" | 760 m || 
|-id=102 bgcolor=#fefefe
| 465102 ||  || — || October 27, 2006 || Kitt Peak || Spacewatch || — || align=right data-sort-value="0.70" | 700 m || 
|-id=103 bgcolor=#fefefe
| 465103 ||  || — || September 19, 2006 || Kitt Peak || Spacewatch || — || align=right data-sort-value="0.75" | 750 m || 
|-id=104 bgcolor=#E9E9E9
| 465104 ||  || — || October 29, 2006 || Mount Lemmon || Mount Lemmon Survey || (5) || align=right data-sort-value="0.87" | 870 m || 
|-id=105 bgcolor=#E9E9E9
| 465105 ||  || — || October 31, 2006 || Kitt Peak || Spacewatch || — || align=right data-sort-value="0.58" | 580 m || 
|-id=106 bgcolor=#fefefe
| 465106 ||  || — || October 21, 2006 || Kitt Peak || Spacewatch || MAS || align=right data-sort-value="0.69" | 690 m || 
|-id=107 bgcolor=#fefefe
| 465107 ||  || — || November 9, 2006 || Kitt Peak || Spacewatch || — || align=right data-sort-value="0.99" | 990 m || 
|-id=108 bgcolor=#E9E9E9
| 465108 ||  || — || September 30, 2006 || Mount Lemmon || Mount Lemmon Survey || (5) || align=right data-sort-value="0.65" | 650 m || 
|-id=109 bgcolor=#E9E9E9
| 465109 ||  || — || November 10, 2006 || Kitt Peak || Spacewatch || MAR || align=right data-sort-value="0.96" | 960 m || 
|-id=110 bgcolor=#fefefe
| 465110 ||  || — || November 11, 2006 || Catalina || CSS || H || align=right data-sort-value="0.88" | 880 m || 
|-id=111 bgcolor=#E9E9E9
| 465111 ||  || — || October 28, 2006 || Mount Lemmon || Mount Lemmon Survey || — || align=right data-sort-value="0.73" | 730 m || 
|-id=112 bgcolor=#E9E9E9
| 465112 ||  || — || November 11, 2006 || Kitt Peak || Spacewatch || — || align=right data-sort-value="0.67" | 670 m || 
|-id=113 bgcolor=#E9E9E9
| 465113 ||  || — || November 11, 2006 || Kitt Peak || Spacewatch || — || align=right data-sort-value="0.83" | 830 m || 
|-id=114 bgcolor=#fefefe
| 465114 ||  || — || September 28, 2006 || Mount Lemmon || Mount Lemmon Survey || — || align=right data-sort-value="0.82" | 820 m || 
|-id=115 bgcolor=#fefefe
| 465115 ||  || — || October 31, 2002 || Socorro || LINEAR || — || align=right data-sort-value="0.94" | 940 m || 
|-id=116 bgcolor=#fefefe
| 465116 ||  || — || November 19, 2006 || Catalina || CSS || — || align=right data-sort-value="0.88" | 880 m || 
|-id=117 bgcolor=#E9E9E9
| 465117 ||  || — || November 19, 2006 || Kitt Peak || Spacewatch || — || align=right data-sort-value="0.60" | 600 m || 
|-id=118 bgcolor=#E9E9E9
| 465118 ||  || — || October 4, 2006 || Mount Lemmon || Mount Lemmon Survey || — || align=right data-sort-value="0.97" | 970 m || 
|-id=119 bgcolor=#fefefe
| 465119 ||  || — || November 19, 2006 || Kitt Peak || Spacewatch || — || align=right data-sort-value="0.80" | 800 m || 
|-id=120 bgcolor=#E9E9E9
| 465120 ||  || — || November 20, 2006 || Mount Lemmon || Mount Lemmon Survey || (1547) || align=right | 1.4 km || 
|-id=121 bgcolor=#d6d6d6
| 465121 ||  || — || November 18, 2006 || Mount Lemmon || Mount Lemmon Survey || 7:4 || align=right | 3.3 km || 
|-id=122 bgcolor=#E9E9E9
| 465122 ||  || — || November 22, 2006 || Catalina || CSS || — || align=right data-sort-value="0.73" | 730 m || 
|-id=123 bgcolor=#E9E9E9
| 465123 ||  || — || November 23, 2006 || Kitt Peak || Spacewatch || — || align=right data-sort-value="0.62" | 620 m || 
|-id=124 bgcolor=#E9E9E9
| 465124 ||  || — || November 23, 2006 || Kitt Peak || Spacewatch || (5) || align=right data-sort-value="0.82" | 820 m || 
|-id=125 bgcolor=#E9E9E9
| 465125 ||  || — || November 25, 2006 || Kitt Peak || Spacewatch || — || align=right data-sort-value="0.81" | 810 m || 
|-id=126 bgcolor=#E9E9E9
| 465126 ||  || — || November 23, 2006 || Mount Lemmon || Mount Lemmon Survey || — || align=right data-sort-value="0.86" | 860 m || 
|-id=127 bgcolor=#E9E9E9
| 465127 ||  || — || November 28, 2006 || Mount Lemmon || Mount Lemmon Survey || — || align=right | 1.1 km || 
|-id=128 bgcolor=#E9E9E9
| 465128 ||  || — || December 15, 2006 || Kitt Peak || Spacewatch || KON || align=right | 2.0 km || 
|-id=129 bgcolor=#E9E9E9
| 465129 ||  || — || December 1, 2006 || Mount Lemmon || Mount Lemmon Survey || — || align=right | 1.2 km || 
|-id=130 bgcolor=#E9E9E9
| 465130 ||  || — || September 28, 2006 || Mount Lemmon || Mount Lemmon Survey || — || align=right | 1.3 km || 
|-id=131 bgcolor=#E9E9E9
| 465131 ||  || — || December 21, 2006 || Kitt Peak || Spacewatch || BRG || align=right | 1.7 km || 
|-id=132 bgcolor=#E9E9E9
| 465132 ||  || — || November 13, 2006 || Kitt Peak || Spacewatch || — || align=right | 1.00 km || 
|-id=133 bgcolor=#E9E9E9
| 465133 ||  || — || October 29, 2006 || Mount Lemmon || Mount Lemmon Survey || — || align=right | 1.4 km || 
|-id=134 bgcolor=#E9E9E9
| 465134 ||  || — || November 1, 2006 || Kitt Peak || Spacewatch || — || align=right | 2.0 km || 
|-id=135 bgcolor=#E9E9E9
| 465135 ||  || — || November 27, 2006 || Mount Lemmon || Mount Lemmon Survey || — || align=right | 1.2 km || 
|-id=136 bgcolor=#E9E9E9
| 465136 ||  || — || December 24, 2006 || Kitt Peak || Spacewatch || — || align=right | 1.4 km || 
|-id=137 bgcolor=#E9E9E9
| 465137 ||  || — || December 21, 2006 || Mount Lemmon || Mount Lemmon Survey || — || align=right | 2.3 km || 
|-id=138 bgcolor=#E9E9E9
| 465138 ||  || — || December 27, 2006 || Mount Lemmon || Mount Lemmon Survey || — || align=right | 1.0 km || 
|-id=139 bgcolor=#E9E9E9
| 465139 ||  || — || January 8, 2007 || Kitt Peak || Spacewatch || — || align=right | 1.9 km || 
|-id=140 bgcolor=#E9E9E9
| 465140 ||  || — || November 27, 2006 || Mount Lemmon || Mount Lemmon Survey || — || align=right data-sort-value="0.82" | 820 m || 
|-id=141 bgcolor=#E9E9E9
| 465141 ||  || — || January 24, 2007 || Mount Lemmon || Mount Lemmon Survey || — || align=right | 1.2 km || 
|-id=142 bgcolor=#E9E9E9
| 465142 ||  || — || January 25, 2007 || Catalina || CSS || — || align=right | 1.0 km || 
|-id=143 bgcolor=#E9E9E9
| 465143 ||  || — || November 27, 2006 || Mount Lemmon || Mount Lemmon Survey || — || align=right | 1.2 km || 
|-id=144 bgcolor=#E9E9E9
| 465144 ||  || — || January 9, 2007 || Mount Lemmon || Mount Lemmon Survey || — || align=right data-sort-value="0.77" | 770 m || 
|-id=145 bgcolor=#E9E9E9
| 465145 ||  || — || January 27, 2007 || Kitt Peak || Spacewatch || EUN || align=right data-sort-value="0.90" | 900 m || 
|-id=146 bgcolor=#E9E9E9
| 465146 ||  || — || January 27, 2007 || Kitt Peak || Spacewatch || — || align=right | 1.0 km || 
|-id=147 bgcolor=#E9E9E9
| 465147 ||  || — || November 28, 2006 || Mount Lemmon || Mount Lemmon Survey || — || align=right | 1.1 km || 
|-id=148 bgcolor=#E9E9E9
| 465148 ||  || — || February 6, 2007 || Mount Lemmon || Mount Lemmon Survey || — || align=right | 1.4 km || 
|-id=149 bgcolor=#E9E9E9
| 465149 ||  || — || January 10, 2007 || Mount Lemmon || Mount Lemmon Survey || — || align=right | 1.5 km || 
|-id=150 bgcolor=#E9E9E9
| 465150 ||  || — || January 27, 2007 || Mount Lemmon || Mount Lemmon Survey || — || align=right | 1.0 km || 
|-id=151 bgcolor=#E9E9E9
| 465151 ||  || — || February 6, 2007 || Mount Lemmon || Mount Lemmon Survey || — || align=right | 1.4 km || 
|-id=152 bgcolor=#d6d6d6
| 465152 ||  || — || February 10, 2007 || Mount Lemmon || Mount Lemmon Survey || 3:2 || align=right | 4.1 km || 
|-id=153 bgcolor=#E9E9E9
| 465153 ||  || — || January 27, 2007 || Catalina || CSS || — || align=right | 2.1 km || 
|-id=154 bgcolor=#E9E9E9
| 465154 ||  || — || February 9, 2007 || Catalina || CSS || — || align=right | 1.6 km || 
|-id=155 bgcolor=#E9E9E9
| 465155 ||  || — || February 17, 2007 || Kitt Peak || Spacewatch || — || align=right | 2.3 km || 
|-id=156 bgcolor=#E9E9E9
| 465156 ||  || — || January 17, 2007 || Kitt Peak || Spacewatch || — || align=right data-sort-value="0.97" | 970 m || 
|-id=157 bgcolor=#E9E9E9
| 465157 ||  || — || November 24, 2006 || Kitt Peak || Spacewatch || — || align=right | 1.4 km || 
|-id=158 bgcolor=#E9E9E9
| 465158 ||  || — || February 17, 2007 || Kitt Peak || Spacewatch || — || align=right | 1.6 km || 
|-id=159 bgcolor=#E9E9E9
| 465159 ||  || — || February 17, 2007 || Kitt Peak || Spacewatch || — || align=right | 1.2 km || 
|-id=160 bgcolor=#E9E9E9
| 465160 ||  || — || February 10, 2007 || Catalina || CSS || — || align=right | 2.0 km || 
|-id=161 bgcolor=#E9E9E9
| 465161 ||  || — || February 16, 2007 || Catalina || CSS || — || align=right | 1.3 km || 
|-id=162 bgcolor=#E9E9E9
| 465162 ||  || — || February 21, 2007 || Kitt Peak || Spacewatch || — || align=right | 1.5 km || 
|-id=163 bgcolor=#E9E9E9
| 465163 ||  || — || February 21, 2007 || Kitt Peak || Spacewatch || — || align=right data-sort-value="0.99" | 990 m || 
|-id=164 bgcolor=#E9E9E9
| 465164 ||  || — || February 25, 2007 || Anderson Mesa || LONEOS || — || align=right | 2.2 km || 
|-id=165 bgcolor=#E9E9E9
| 465165 ||  || — || February 22, 2007 || Kitt Peak || Spacewatch || NEM || align=right | 1.7 km || 
|-id=166 bgcolor=#FFC2E0
| 465166 ||  || — || March 9, 2007 || Kitt Peak || Spacewatch || AMO || align=right data-sort-value="0.45" | 450 m || 
|-id=167 bgcolor=#E9E9E9
| 465167 ||  || — || December 1, 2006 || Mount Lemmon || Mount Lemmon Survey || — || align=right | 1.4 km || 
|-id=168 bgcolor=#E9E9E9
| 465168 ||  || — || March 9, 2007 || Catalina || CSS || — || align=right | 2.1 km || 
|-id=169 bgcolor=#E9E9E9
| 465169 ||  || — || March 9, 2007 || Kitt Peak || Spacewatch || — || align=right | 1.8 km || 
|-id=170 bgcolor=#E9E9E9
| 465170 ||  || — || February 17, 2007 || Kitt Peak || Spacewatch || — || align=right | 1.3 km || 
|-id=171 bgcolor=#E9E9E9
| 465171 ||  || — || September 7, 2004 || Kitt Peak || Spacewatch || — || align=right | 2.9 km || 
|-id=172 bgcolor=#E9E9E9
| 465172 ||  || — || January 17, 2007 || Kitt Peak || Spacewatch || — || align=right | 1.3 km || 
|-id=173 bgcolor=#E9E9E9
| 465173 ||  || — || March 10, 2007 || Mount Lemmon || Mount Lemmon Survey || AEO || align=right data-sort-value="0.85" | 850 m || 
|-id=174 bgcolor=#E9E9E9
| 465174 ||  || — || March 12, 2007 || Mount Lemmon || Mount Lemmon Survey || — || align=right | 1.5 km || 
|-id=175 bgcolor=#E9E9E9
| 465175 ||  || — || February 21, 2007 || Mount Lemmon || Mount Lemmon Survey || — || align=right | 1.6 km || 
|-id=176 bgcolor=#E9E9E9
| 465176 ||  || — || February 23, 2007 || Mount Lemmon || Mount Lemmon Survey || — || align=right | 1.0 km || 
|-id=177 bgcolor=#E9E9E9
| 465177 ||  || — || March 14, 2007 || Mount Lemmon || Mount Lemmon Survey || — || align=right data-sort-value="0.93" | 930 m || 
|-id=178 bgcolor=#E9E9E9
| 465178 ||  || — || January 28, 2007 || Mount Lemmon || Mount Lemmon Survey || — || align=right | 1.3 km || 
|-id=179 bgcolor=#E9E9E9
| 465179 ||  || — || February 21, 2007 || Kitt Peak || Spacewatch || — || align=right | 1.1 km || 
|-id=180 bgcolor=#E9E9E9
| 465180 ||  || — || March 12, 2007 || Kitt Peak || Spacewatch || — || align=right | 1.5 km || 
|-id=181 bgcolor=#E9E9E9
| 465181 ||  || — || February 23, 2007 || Mount Lemmon || Mount Lemmon Survey || — || align=right | 1.1 km || 
|-id=182 bgcolor=#E9E9E9
| 465182 ||  || — || March 14, 2007 || Kitt Peak || Spacewatch || — || align=right | 1.7 km || 
|-id=183 bgcolor=#E9E9E9
| 465183 ||  || — || March 10, 2007 || Kitt Peak || Spacewatch || — || align=right | 1.3 km || 
|-id=184 bgcolor=#E9E9E9
| 465184 ||  || — || March 20, 2007 || Kitt Peak || Spacewatch || — || align=right | 1.4 km || 
|-id=185 bgcolor=#E9E9E9
| 465185 ||  || — || September 24, 1995 || Kitt Peak || Spacewatch || — || align=right | 1.5 km || 
|-id=186 bgcolor=#E9E9E9
| 465186 ||  || — || March 26, 2007 || Mount Lemmon || Mount Lemmon Survey || — || align=right | 1.8 km || 
|-id=187 bgcolor=#E9E9E9
| 465187 ||  || — || March 17, 2007 || Kitt Peak || Spacewatch || EUN || align=right | 1.3 km || 
|-id=188 bgcolor=#E9E9E9
| 465188 ||  || — || March 26, 2007 || Kitt Peak || Spacewatch || GEF || align=right | 1.2 km || 
|-id=189 bgcolor=#E9E9E9
| 465189 ||  || — || April 15, 2007 || Kitt Peak || Spacewatch || DOR || align=right | 2.1 km || 
|-id=190 bgcolor=#E9E9E9
| 465190 ||  || — || March 26, 2007 || Kitt Peak || Spacewatch || — || align=right | 1.6 km || 
|-id=191 bgcolor=#E9E9E9
| 465191 ||  || — || April 16, 2007 || Socorro || LINEAR || — || align=right | 1.5 km || 
|-id=192 bgcolor=#E9E9E9
| 465192 ||  || — || April 18, 2007 || Kitt Peak || Spacewatch || — || align=right | 2.1 km || 
|-id=193 bgcolor=#E9E9E9
| 465193 ||  || — || April 18, 2007 || Kitt Peak || Spacewatch || AGN || align=right | 1.3 km || 
|-id=194 bgcolor=#E9E9E9
| 465194 ||  || — || April 11, 2007 || Kitt Peak || Spacewatch || DOR || align=right | 2.3 km || 
|-id=195 bgcolor=#E9E9E9
| 465195 ||  || — || March 16, 2007 || Kitt Peak || Spacewatch || — || align=right | 2.8 km || 
|-id=196 bgcolor=#E9E9E9
| 465196 ||  || — || April 16, 2007 || Catalina || CSS || — || align=right | 2.7 km || 
|-id=197 bgcolor=#E9E9E9
| 465197 ||  || — || April 20, 2007 || Kitt Peak || Spacewatch || — || align=right | 1.8 km || 
|-id=198 bgcolor=#E9E9E9
| 465198 ||  || — || April 22, 2007 || Mount Lemmon || Mount Lemmon Survey || — || align=right | 2.1 km || 
|-id=199 bgcolor=#E9E9E9
| 465199 ||  || — || May 9, 2007 || Mount Lemmon || Mount Lemmon Survey || — || align=right | 2.2 km || 
|-id=200 bgcolor=#E9E9E9
| 465200 ||  || — || May 10, 2007 || Kitt Peak || Spacewatch || — || align=right | 2.1 km || 
|}

465201–465300 

|-bgcolor=#E9E9E9
| 465201 ||  || — || March 13, 2007 || Mount Lemmon || Mount Lemmon Survey || — || align=right | 1.9 km || 
|-id=202 bgcolor=#E9E9E9
| 465202 ||  || — || May 12, 2007 || Kitt Peak || Spacewatch || — || align=right | 2.6 km || 
|-id=203 bgcolor=#E9E9E9
| 465203 ||  || — || April 25, 2007 || Kitt Peak || Spacewatch || — || align=right | 2.1 km || 
|-id=204 bgcolor=#E9E9E9
| 465204 ||  || — || June 14, 2007 || Kitt Peak || Spacewatch || — || align=right | 1.9 km || 
|-id=205 bgcolor=#E9E9E9
| 465205 ||  || — || June 22, 2007 || Kitt Peak || Spacewatch || — || align=right | 2.7 km || 
|-id=206 bgcolor=#fefefe
| 465206 ||  || — || July 21, 2007 || Lulin Observatory || LUSS || — || align=right data-sort-value="0.62" | 620 m || 
|-id=207 bgcolor=#fefefe
| 465207 ||  || — || August 9, 2007 || Socorro || LINEAR || — || align=right data-sort-value="0.78" | 780 m || 
|-id=208 bgcolor=#d6d6d6
| 465208 ||  || — || August 15, 2007 || Pla D'Arguines || R. Ferrando || — || align=right | 3.5 km || 
|-id=209 bgcolor=#fefefe
| 465209 ||  || — || August 11, 2007 || Socorro || LINEAR || — || align=right data-sort-value="0.77" | 770 m || 
|-id=210 bgcolor=#FA8072
| 465210 ||  || — || August 23, 2007 || Kitt Peak || Spacewatch || — || align=right data-sort-value="0.52" | 520 m || 
|-id=211 bgcolor=#fefefe
| 465211 ||  || — || September 5, 2007 || Dauban || Chante-Perdrix Obs. || — || align=right data-sort-value="0.57" | 570 m || 
|-id=212 bgcolor=#d6d6d6
| 465212 ||  || — || September 5, 2007 || Dauban || Chante-Perdrix Obs. || — || align=right | 3.1 km || 
|-id=213 bgcolor=#fefefe
| 465213 ||  || — || September 11, 2007 || Purple Mountain || PMO NEO || H || align=right data-sort-value="0.53" | 530 m || 
|-id=214 bgcolor=#fefefe
| 465214 ||  || — || September 4, 2007 || Catalina || CSS || — || align=right data-sort-value="0.89" | 890 m || 
|-id=215 bgcolor=#fefefe
| 465215 ||  || — || September 5, 2007 || Catalina || CSS || — || align=right data-sort-value="0.88" | 880 m || 
|-id=216 bgcolor=#d6d6d6
| 465216 ||  || — || September 9, 2007 || Kitt Peak || Spacewatch || — || align=right | 3.2 km || 
|-id=217 bgcolor=#d6d6d6
| 465217 ||  || — || September 10, 2007 || Kitt Peak || Spacewatch || — || align=right | 2.5 km || 
|-id=218 bgcolor=#d6d6d6
| 465218 ||  || — || August 23, 2007 || Kitt Peak || Spacewatch || EOS || align=right | 1.7 km || 
|-id=219 bgcolor=#d6d6d6
| 465219 ||  || — || September 10, 2007 || Mount Lemmon || Mount Lemmon Survey || THM || align=right | 2.5 km || 
|-id=220 bgcolor=#fefefe
| 465220 ||  || — || September 11, 2007 || Kitt Peak || Spacewatch || (2076) || align=right data-sort-value="0.60" | 600 m || 
|-id=221 bgcolor=#fefefe
| 465221 ||  || — || September 11, 2007 || Kitt Peak || Spacewatch || — || align=right data-sort-value="0.73" | 730 m || 
|-id=222 bgcolor=#fefefe
| 465222 ||  || — || September 11, 2007 || Kitt Peak || Spacewatch || — || align=right data-sort-value="0.67" | 670 m || 
|-id=223 bgcolor=#d6d6d6
| 465223 ||  || — || September 12, 2007 || Mount Lemmon || Mount Lemmon Survey || — || align=right | 2.5 km || 
|-id=224 bgcolor=#d6d6d6
| 465224 ||  || — || September 12, 2007 || Mount Lemmon || Mount Lemmon Survey || — || align=right | 2.2 km || 
|-id=225 bgcolor=#d6d6d6
| 465225 ||  || — || September 15, 2007 || Bergisch Gladbach || W. Bickel || — || align=right | 2.8 km || 
|-id=226 bgcolor=#fefefe
| 465226 ||  || — || September 3, 2007 || Catalina || CSS || — || align=right data-sort-value="0.71" | 710 m || 
|-id=227 bgcolor=#d6d6d6
| 465227 ||  || — || September 10, 2007 || Kitt Peak || Spacewatch || — || align=right | 2.8 km || 
|-id=228 bgcolor=#fefefe
| 465228 ||  || — || September 10, 2007 || Mount Lemmon || Mount Lemmon Survey || — || align=right data-sort-value="0.63" | 630 m || 
|-id=229 bgcolor=#d6d6d6
| 465229 ||  || — || September 11, 2007 || Mount Lemmon || Mount Lemmon Survey || — || align=right | 2.6 km || 
|-id=230 bgcolor=#d6d6d6
| 465230 ||  || — || September 11, 2007 || Kitt Peak || Spacewatch || EOS || align=right | 1.6 km || 
|-id=231 bgcolor=#fefefe
| 465231 ||  || — || September 10, 2007 || Kitt Peak || Spacewatch || — || align=right data-sort-value="0.72" | 720 m || 
|-id=232 bgcolor=#d6d6d6
| 465232 ||  || — || August 23, 2007 || Kitt Peak || Spacewatch || — || align=right | 2.9 km || 
|-id=233 bgcolor=#fefefe
| 465233 ||  || — || August 22, 2007 || Socorro || LINEAR || — || align=right data-sort-value="0.67" | 670 m || 
|-id=234 bgcolor=#fefefe
| 465234 ||  || — || September 13, 2007 || Kitt Peak || Spacewatch || — || align=right data-sort-value="0.72" | 720 m || 
|-id=235 bgcolor=#d6d6d6
| 465235 ||  || — || September 5, 2007 || Anderson Mesa || LONEOS || — || align=right | 3.8 km || 
|-id=236 bgcolor=#d6d6d6
| 465236 ||  || — || September 15, 2007 || Kitt Peak || Spacewatch || — || align=right | 2.9 km || 
|-id=237 bgcolor=#d6d6d6
| 465237 ||  || — || September 9, 2007 || Kitt Peak || Spacewatch || — || align=right | 2.9 km || 
|-id=238 bgcolor=#fefefe
| 465238 ||  || — || September 9, 2007 || Mount Lemmon || Mount Lemmon Survey || — || align=right data-sort-value="0.57" | 570 m || 
|-id=239 bgcolor=#d6d6d6
| 465239 ||  || — || September 11, 2007 || Kitt Peak || Spacewatch || — || align=right | 3.1 km || 
|-id=240 bgcolor=#d6d6d6
| 465240 ||  || — || September 9, 2007 || Kitt Peak || Spacewatch || — || align=right | 2.8 km || 
|-id=241 bgcolor=#d6d6d6
| 465241 ||  || — || September 12, 2007 || Mount Lemmon || Mount Lemmon Survey || — || align=right | 2.6 km || 
|-id=242 bgcolor=#d6d6d6
| 465242 ||  || — || September 12, 2007 || Mount Lemmon || Mount Lemmon Survey || EOS || align=right | 1.9 km || 
|-id=243 bgcolor=#d6d6d6
| 465243 ||  || — || September 13, 2007 || Mount Lemmon || Mount Lemmon Survey || THM || align=right | 2.0 km || 
|-id=244 bgcolor=#d6d6d6
| 465244 ||  || — || September 13, 2007 || Mount Lemmon || Mount Lemmon Survey || — || align=right | 2.6 km || 
|-id=245 bgcolor=#d6d6d6
| 465245 ||  || — || September 13, 2007 || Mount Lemmon || Mount Lemmon Survey || — || align=right | 2.6 km || 
|-id=246 bgcolor=#d6d6d6
| 465246 ||  || — || March 8, 2005 || Mount Lemmon || Mount Lemmon Survey || — || align=right | 3.7 km || 
|-id=247 bgcolor=#d6d6d6
| 465247 ||  || — || September 12, 2007 || Mount Lemmon || Mount Lemmon Survey || VER || align=right | 2.5 km || 
|-id=248 bgcolor=#fefefe
| 465248 ||  || — || September 12, 2007 || Mount Lemmon || Mount Lemmon Survey || — || align=right data-sort-value="0.81" | 810 m || 
|-id=249 bgcolor=#d6d6d6
| 465249 ||  || — || September 12, 2007 || Catalina || CSS || — || align=right | 3.2 km || 
|-id=250 bgcolor=#fefefe
| 465250 ||  || — || September 12, 2007 || Mount Lemmon || Mount Lemmon Survey || — || align=right data-sort-value="0.81" | 810 m || 
|-id=251 bgcolor=#fefefe
| 465251 ||  || — || September 9, 2007 || Kitt Peak || Spacewatch || — || align=right data-sort-value="0.66" | 660 m || 
|-id=252 bgcolor=#fefefe
| 465252 ||  || — || September 13, 2007 || Catalina || CSS || — || align=right data-sort-value="0.78" | 780 m || 
|-id=253 bgcolor=#d6d6d6
| 465253 ||  || — || September 14, 2007 || Mount Lemmon || Mount Lemmon Survey || — || align=right | 2.5 km || 
|-id=254 bgcolor=#d6d6d6
| 465254 ||  || — || September 14, 2007 || Socorro || LINEAR || — || align=right | 2.7 km || 
|-id=255 bgcolor=#fefefe
| 465255 ||  || — || September 21, 2007 || Socorro || LINEAR || — || align=right data-sort-value="0.66" | 660 m || 
|-id=256 bgcolor=#fefefe
| 465256 ||  || — || September 4, 2007 || Catalina || CSS || — || align=right data-sort-value="0.65" | 650 m || 
|-id=257 bgcolor=#d6d6d6
| 465257 ||  || — || September 8, 2007 || Mount Lemmon || Mount Lemmon Survey || — || align=right | 3.4 km || 
|-id=258 bgcolor=#d6d6d6
| 465258 ||  || — || September 24, 2007 || Kitt Peak || Spacewatch || 7:4 || align=right | 2.5 km || 
|-id=259 bgcolor=#d6d6d6
| 465259 ||  || — || September 19, 2007 || Kitt Peak || Spacewatch || — || align=right | 3.2 km || 
|-id=260 bgcolor=#d6d6d6
| 465260 ||  || — || September 14, 2007 || Mount Lemmon || Mount Lemmon Survey || — || align=right | 3.2 km || 
|-id=261 bgcolor=#d6d6d6
| 465261 ||  || — || October 4, 2007 || Mount Lemmon || Mount Lemmon Survey || — || align=right | 4.3 km || 
|-id=262 bgcolor=#d6d6d6
| 465262 ||  || — || September 14, 2007 || Mount Lemmon || Mount Lemmon Survey || — || align=right | 2.9 km || 
|-id=263 bgcolor=#d6d6d6
| 465263 ||  || — || September 12, 2007 || Mount Lemmon || Mount Lemmon Survey || — || align=right | 2.6 km || 
|-id=264 bgcolor=#d6d6d6
| 465264 ||  || — || October 6, 2007 || Kitt Peak || Spacewatch || — || align=right | 2.4 km || 
|-id=265 bgcolor=#fefefe
| 465265 ||  || — || July 18, 2007 || Mount Lemmon || Mount Lemmon Survey || — || align=right data-sort-value="0.62" | 620 m || 
|-id=266 bgcolor=#d6d6d6
| 465266 ||  || — || August 23, 2007 || Kitt Peak || Spacewatch || — || align=right | 2.7 km || 
|-id=267 bgcolor=#d6d6d6
| 465267 ||  || — || October 7, 2007 || Mount Lemmon || Mount Lemmon Survey || — || align=right | 2.5 km || 
|-id=268 bgcolor=#fefefe
| 465268 ||  || — || October 8, 2007 || Catalina || CSS || H || align=right data-sort-value="0.62" | 620 m || 
|-id=269 bgcolor=#d6d6d6
| 465269 ||  || — || October 12, 2007 || Socorro || LINEAR || — || align=right | 2.8 km || 
|-id=270 bgcolor=#fefefe
| 465270 ||  || — || October 7, 2007 || Catalina || CSS || (2076) || align=right data-sort-value="0.67" | 670 m || 
|-id=271 bgcolor=#FA8072
| 465271 ||  || — || September 13, 2007 || Mount Lemmon || Mount Lemmon Survey || — || align=right data-sort-value="0.75" | 750 m || 
|-id=272 bgcolor=#fefefe
| 465272 ||  || — || October 8, 2007 || Mount Lemmon || Mount Lemmon Survey || — || align=right data-sort-value="0.64" | 640 m || 
|-id=273 bgcolor=#d6d6d6
| 465273 ||  || — || October 8, 2007 || Mount Lemmon || Mount Lemmon Survey || — || align=right | 3.6 km || 
|-id=274 bgcolor=#fefefe
| 465274 ||  || — || October 6, 2007 || Kitt Peak || Spacewatch || — || align=right data-sort-value="0.69" | 690 m || 
|-id=275 bgcolor=#fefefe
| 465275 ||  || — || October 11, 2007 || Socorro || LINEAR || — || align=right data-sort-value="0.72" | 720 m || 
|-id=276 bgcolor=#fefefe
| 465276 ||  || — || September 12, 2007 || Mount Lemmon || Mount Lemmon Survey || — || align=right data-sort-value="0.75" | 750 m || 
|-id=277 bgcolor=#d6d6d6
| 465277 ||  || — || October 13, 2007 || La Sagra || OAM Obs. || — || align=right | 2.4 km || 
|-id=278 bgcolor=#d6d6d6
| 465278 ||  || — || October 7, 2007 || Kitt Peak || Spacewatch || EOS || align=right | 2.0 km || 
|-id=279 bgcolor=#fefefe
| 465279 ||  || — || October 8, 2007 || Anderson Mesa || LONEOS || — || align=right data-sort-value="0.75" | 750 m || 
|-id=280 bgcolor=#fefefe
| 465280 ||  || — || October 8, 2007 || Catalina || CSS || — || align=right data-sort-value="0.60" | 600 m || 
|-id=281 bgcolor=#d6d6d6
| 465281 ||  || — || September 12, 2007 || Mount Lemmon || Mount Lemmon Survey || — || align=right | 2.2 km || 
|-id=282 bgcolor=#d6d6d6
| 465282 ||  || — || October 8, 2007 || Mount Lemmon || Mount Lemmon Survey || — || align=right | 3.1 km || 
|-id=283 bgcolor=#fefefe
| 465283 ||  || — || October 7, 2007 || Kitt Peak || Spacewatch || — || align=right data-sort-value="0.67" | 670 m || 
|-id=284 bgcolor=#C2FFFF
| 465284 ||  || — || October 8, 2007 || Mount Lemmon || Mount Lemmon Survey || L4 || align=right | 7.2 km || 
|-id=285 bgcolor=#fefefe
| 465285 ||  || — || October 8, 2007 || Catalina || CSS || — || align=right data-sort-value="0.83" | 830 m || 
|-id=286 bgcolor=#fefefe
| 465286 ||  || — || October 10, 2007 || Kitt Peak || Spacewatch || — || align=right data-sort-value="0.64" | 640 m || 
|-id=287 bgcolor=#d6d6d6
| 465287 ||  || — || October 10, 2007 || Mount Lemmon || Mount Lemmon Survey || — || align=right | 2.7 km || 
|-id=288 bgcolor=#fefefe
| 465288 ||  || — || October 11, 2007 || Mount Lemmon || Mount Lemmon Survey || — || align=right data-sort-value="0.65" | 650 m || 
|-id=289 bgcolor=#d6d6d6
| 465289 ||  || — || October 10, 2007 || Mount Lemmon || Mount Lemmon Survey || — || align=right | 2.0 km || 
|-id=290 bgcolor=#d6d6d6
| 465290 ||  || — || October 4, 2007 || Kitt Peak || Spacewatch || — || align=right | 3.2 km || 
|-id=291 bgcolor=#d6d6d6
| 465291 ||  || — || October 11, 2007 || Mount Lemmon || Mount Lemmon Survey || — || align=right | 2.7 km || 
|-id=292 bgcolor=#fefefe
| 465292 ||  || — || October 11, 2007 || Kitt Peak || Spacewatch || — || align=right data-sort-value="0.84" | 840 m || 
|-id=293 bgcolor=#d6d6d6
| 465293 ||  || — || October 11, 2007 || Kitt Peak || Spacewatch || Tj (2.93) || align=right | 3.7 km || 
|-id=294 bgcolor=#d6d6d6
| 465294 ||  || — || September 30, 2007 || Kitt Peak || Spacewatch || — || align=right | 2.6 km || 
|-id=295 bgcolor=#fefefe
| 465295 ||  || — || September 30, 2007 || Kitt Peak || Spacewatch || V || align=right data-sort-value="0.45" | 450 m || 
|-id=296 bgcolor=#fefefe
| 465296 ||  || — || September 21, 2007 || XuYi || PMO NEO || — || align=right data-sort-value="0.83" | 830 m || 
|-id=297 bgcolor=#d6d6d6
| 465297 ||  || — || September 8, 2007 || Anderson Mesa || LONEOS || — || align=right | 2.9 km || 
|-id=298 bgcolor=#d6d6d6
| 465298 ||  || — || September 12, 2007 || Mount Lemmon || Mount Lemmon Survey || — || align=right | 3.2 km || 
|-id=299 bgcolor=#d6d6d6
| 465299 ||  || — || September 12, 2007 || Catalina || CSS || Tj (2.99) || align=right | 4.0 km || 
|-id=300 bgcolor=#d6d6d6
| 465300 ||  || — || September 5, 2007 || Mount Lemmon || Mount Lemmon Survey || — || align=right | 2.7 km || 
|}

465301–465400 

|-bgcolor=#d6d6d6
| 465301 ||  || — || October 15, 2007 || Mount Lemmon || Mount Lemmon Survey || EOS || align=right | 2.6 km || 
|-id=302 bgcolor=#d6d6d6
| 465302 ||  || — || September 12, 2007 || Mount Lemmon || Mount Lemmon Survey || — || align=right | 3.0 km || 
|-id=303 bgcolor=#d6d6d6
| 465303 ||  || — || October 8, 2007 || Mount Lemmon || Mount Lemmon Survey || 7:4 || align=right | 4.5 km || 
|-id=304 bgcolor=#fefefe
| 465304 ||  || — || October 10, 2007 || Kitt Peak || Spacewatch || — || align=right data-sort-value="0.70" | 700 m || 
|-id=305 bgcolor=#d6d6d6
| 465305 ||  || — || October 4, 2007 || Kitt Peak || Spacewatch || — || align=right | 3.1 km || 
|-id=306 bgcolor=#d6d6d6
| 465306 ||  || — || October 8, 2007 || Kitt Peak || Spacewatch || — || align=right | 2.6 km || 
|-id=307 bgcolor=#FA8072
| 465307 ||  || — || October 19, 2007 || Catalina || CSS || — || align=right data-sort-value="0.80" | 800 m || 
|-id=308 bgcolor=#d6d6d6
| 465308 ||  || — || October 12, 2007 || Socorro || LINEAR || — || align=right | 3.3 km || 
|-id=309 bgcolor=#fefefe
| 465309 ||  || — || October 5, 2007 || Kitt Peak || Spacewatch || — || align=right data-sort-value="0.75" | 750 m || 
|-id=310 bgcolor=#fefefe
| 465310 ||  || — || October 16, 2007 || Kitt Peak || Spacewatch || — || align=right data-sort-value="0.54" | 540 m || 
|-id=311 bgcolor=#fefefe
| 465311 ||  || — || October 16, 2007 || Kitt Peak || Spacewatch || — || align=right data-sort-value="0.81" | 810 m || 
|-id=312 bgcolor=#d6d6d6
| 465312 ||  || — || October 18, 2007 || Kitt Peak || Spacewatch || — || align=right | 2.7 km || 
|-id=313 bgcolor=#d6d6d6
| 465313 ||  || — || October 18, 2007 || Kitt Peak || Spacewatch || — || align=right | 2.9 km || 
|-id=314 bgcolor=#d6d6d6
| 465314 ||  || — || October 30, 2007 || Mount Lemmon || Mount Lemmon Survey || THM || align=right | 2.5 km || 
|-id=315 bgcolor=#fefefe
| 465315 ||  || — || September 15, 2007 || Mount Lemmon || Mount Lemmon Survey || V || align=right data-sort-value="0.41" | 410 m || 
|-id=316 bgcolor=#fefefe
| 465316 ||  || — || October 7, 2007 || Mount Lemmon || Mount Lemmon Survey || — || align=right data-sort-value="0.69" | 690 m || 
|-id=317 bgcolor=#fefefe
| 465317 ||  || — || October 18, 2007 || Kitt Peak || Spacewatch || — || align=right data-sort-value="0.60" | 600 m || 
|-id=318 bgcolor=#fefefe
| 465318 ||  || — || October 24, 2007 || Mount Lemmon || Mount Lemmon Survey || — || align=right data-sort-value="0.66" | 660 m || 
|-id=319 bgcolor=#fefefe
| 465319 ||  || — || October 30, 2007 || Catalina || CSS || — || align=right data-sort-value="0.64" | 640 m || 
|-id=320 bgcolor=#fefefe
| 465320 ||  || — || October 16, 2007 || Mount Lemmon || Mount Lemmon Survey || — || align=right data-sort-value="0.68" | 680 m || 
|-id=321 bgcolor=#fefefe
| 465321 ||  || — || October 18, 2007 || Mount Lemmon || Mount Lemmon Survey || — || align=right data-sort-value="0.63" | 630 m || 
|-id=322 bgcolor=#fefefe
| 465322 ||  || — || September 9, 2007 || Mount Lemmon || Mount Lemmon Survey || — || align=right data-sort-value="0.74" | 740 m || 
|-id=323 bgcolor=#fefefe
| 465323 ||  || — || November 1, 2007 || Kitt Peak || Spacewatch || — || align=right data-sort-value="0.85" | 850 m || 
|-id=324 bgcolor=#fefefe
| 465324 ||  || — || November 2, 2007 || Kitt Peak || Spacewatch || — || align=right data-sort-value="0.79" | 790 m || 
|-id=325 bgcolor=#d6d6d6
| 465325 ||  || — || October 15, 2007 || Kitt Peak || Spacewatch || 7:4 || align=right | 2.6 km || 
|-id=326 bgcolor=#fefefe
| 465326 ||  || — || October 16, 2007 || Catalina || CSS || — || align=right data-sort-value="0.75" | 750 m || 
|-id=327 bgcolor=#d6d6d6
| 465327 ||  || — || October 9, 2007 || Kitt Peak || Spacewatch || VER || align=right | 2.5 km || 
|-id=328 bgcolor=#fefefe
| 465328 ||  || — || November 1, 2007 || Kitt Peak || Spacewatch || — || align=right data-sort-value="0.67" | 670 m || 
|-id=329 bgcolor=#fefefe
| 465329 ||  || — || November 1, 2007 || Kitt Peak || Spacewatch || — || align=right data-sort-value="0.77" | 770 m || 
|-id=330 bgcolor=#d6d6d6
| 465330 ||  || — || September 13, 2007 || Mount Lemmon || Mount Lemmon Survey || — || align=right | 3.0 km || 
|-id=331 bgcolor=#fefefe
| 465331 ||  || — || October 10, 2007 || Mount Lemmon || Mount Lemmon Survey || — || align=right data-sort-value="0.69" | 690 m || 
|-id=332 bgcolor=#fefefe
| 465332 ||  || — || October 21, 2007 || Catalina || CSS || — || align=right data-sort-value="0.91" | 910 m || 
|-id=333 bgcolor=#d6d6d6
| 465333 ||  || — || November 3, 2007 || Kitt Peak || Spacewatch || EOS || align=right | 1.7 km || 
|-id=334 bgcolor=#fefefe
| 465334 ||  || — || November 5, 2007 || Mount Lemmon || Mount Lemmon Survey || V || align=right data-sort-value="0.54" | 540 m || 
|-id=335 bgcolor=#fefefe
| 465335 ||  || — || October 4, 2007 || Kitt Peak || Spacewatch || — || align=right data-sort-value="0.62" | 620 m || 
|-id=336 bgcolor=#d6d6d6
| 465336 ||  || — || November 2, 2007 || Mount Lemmon || Mount Lemmon Survey || — || align=right | 2.7 km || 
|-id=337 bgcolor=#fefefe
| 465337 ||  || — || October 12, 2007 || Mount Lemmon || Mount Lemmon Survey || — || align=right data-sort-value="0.86" | 860 m || 
|-id=338 bgcolor=#fefefe
| 465338 ||  || — || November 4, 2007 || Kitt Peak || Spacewatch || ERI || align=right | 1.0 km || 
|-id=339 bgcolor=#fefefe
| 465339 ||  || — || November 5, 2007 || Mount Lemmon || Mount Lemmon Survey || — || align=right data-sort-value="0.58" | 580 m || 
|-id=340 bgcolor=#fefefe
| 465340 ||  || — || September 20, 2007 || Catalina || CSS || — || align=right data-sort-value="0.76" | 760 m || 
|-id=341 bgcolor=#d6d6d6
| 465341 ||  || — || October 12, 2007 || Kitt Peak || Spacewatch || — || align=right | 2.5 km || 
|-id=342 bgcolor=#FA8072
| 465342 ||  || — || November 9, 2007 || Mount Lemmon || Mount Lemmon Survey || — || align=right data-sort-value="0.57" | 570 m || 
|-id=343 bgcolor=#fefefe
| 465343 ||  || — || September 25, 2007 || Mount Lemmon || Mount Lemmon Survey || — || align=right data-sort-value="0.58" | 580 m || 
|-id=344 bgcolor=#d6d6d6
| 465344 ||  || — || November 13, 2007 || Kitt Peak || Spacewatch || — || align=right | 3.0 km || 
|-id=345 bgcolor=#fefefe
| 465345 ||  || — || November 14, 2007 || Kitt Peak || Spacewatch || — || align=right data-sort-value="0.61" | 610 m || 
|-id=346 bgcolor=#d6d6d6
| 465346 ||  || — || October 20, 2007 || Mount Lemmon || Mount Lemmon Survey || 7:4 || align=right | 2.9 km || 
|-id=347 bgcolor=#fefefe
| 465347 ||  || — || November 2, 2007 || Kitt Peak || Spacewatch || — || align=right data-sort-value="0.65" | 650 m || 
|-id=348 bgcolor=#fefefe
| 465348 ||  || — || November 2, 2007 || Kitt Peak || Spacewatch || — || align=right data-sort-value="0.86" | 860 m || 
|-id=349 bgcolor=#E9E9E9
| 465349 ||  || — || November 8, 2007 || Socorro || LINEAR || — || align=right | 1.2 km || 
|-id=350 bgcolor=#fefefe
| 465350 ||  || — || November 7, 2007 || Kitt Peak || Spacewatch || — || align=right data-sort-value="0.68" | 680 m || 
|-id=351 bgcolor=#fefefe
| 465351 ||  || — || December 3, 2007 || Junk Bond || D. Healy || — || align=right data-sort-value="0.73" | 730 m || 
|-id=352 bgcolor=#fefefe
| 465352 ||  || — || December 5, 2007 || Mount Lemmon || Mount Lemmon Survey || — || align=right data-sort-value="0.50" | 500 m || 
|-id=353 bgcolor=#fefefe
| 465353 ||  || — || December 30, 2007 || Kitt Peak || Spacewatch || MAS || align=right data-sort-value="0.64" | 640 m || 
|-id=354 bgcolor=#fefefe
| 465354 ||  || — || June 3, 2005 || Siding Spring || SSS || — || align=right data-sort-value="0.88" | 880 m || 
|-id=355 bgcolor=#fefefe
| 465355 ||  || — || January 10, 2008 || Kitt Peak || Spacewatch || MAS || align=right data-sort-value="0.63" | 630 m || 
|-id=356 bgcolor=#fefefe
| 465356 ||  || — || December 31, 2007 || Kitt Peak || Spacewatch || — || align=right data-sort-value="0.77" | 770 m || 
|-id=357 bgcolor=#fefefe
| 465357 ||  || — || December 30, 2007 || Mount Lemmon || Mount Lemmon Survey || NYS || align=right data-sort-value="0.50" | 500 m || 
|-id=358 bgcolor=#fefefe
| 465358 ||  || — || January 11, 2008 || Kitt Peak || Spacewatch || — || align=right data-sort-value="0.71" | 710 m || 
|-id=359 bgcolor=#fefefe
| 465359 ||  || — || December 30, 2007 || Mount Lemmon || Mount Lemmon Survey || — || align=right | 1.0 km || 
|-id=360 bgcolor=#fefefe
| 465360 ||  || — || November 20, 2007 || Mount Lemmon || Mount Lemmon Survey || — || align=right data-sort-value="0.70" | 700 m || 
|-id=361 bgcolor=#fefefe
| 465361 ||  || — || December 30, 2007 || Kitt Peak || Spacewatch || NYS || align=right data-sort-value="0.59" | 590 m || 
|-id=362 bgcolor=#fefefe
| 465362 ||  || — || December 31, 2007 || Kitt Peak || Spacewatch || — || align=right data-sort-value="0.72" | 720 m || 
|-id=363 bgcolor=#fefefe
| 465363 ||  || — || January 12, 2008 || Mount Lemmon || Mount Lemmon Survey || — || align=right | 1.1 km || 
|-id=364 bgcolor=#E9E9E9
| 465364 ||  || — || January 16, 2008 || Kitt Peak || Spacewatch || critical || align=right data-sort-value="0.78" | 780 m || 
|-id=365 bgcolor=#FA8072
| 465365 ||  || — || January 31, 2008 || La Sagra || OAM Obs. || H || align=right data-sort-value="0.49" | 490 m || 
|-id=366 bgcolor=#fefefe
| 465366 ||  || — || February 3, 2008 || Kitt Peak || Spacewatch || NYS || align=right data-sort-value="0.88" | 880 m || 
|-id=367 bgcolor=#fefefe
| 465367 ||  || — || February 7, 2008 || Socorro || LINEAR || H || align=right data-sort-value="0.60" | 600 m || 
|-id=368 bgcolor=#fefefe
| 465368 ||  || — || February 2, 2008 || Kitt Peak || Spacewatch || — || align=right data-sort-value="0.65" | 650 m || 
|-id=369 bgcolor=#E9E9E9
| 465369 ||  || — || February 2, 2008 || Kitt Peak || Spacewatch || — || align=right | 1.0 km || 
|-id=370 bgcolor=#d6d6d6
| 465370 ||  || — || February 7, 2008 || Mount Lemmon || Mount Lemmon Survey || 3:2 || align=right | 4.1 km || 
|-id=371 bgcolor=#fefefe
| 465371 ||  || — || February 8, 2008 || Kitt Peak || Spacewatch || — || align=right data-sort-value="0.54" | 540 m || 
|-id=372 bgcolor=#fefefe
| 465372 ||  || — || February 10, 2008 || Kitt Peak || Spacewatch || — || align=right data-sort-value="0.69" | 690 m || 
|-id=373 bgcolor=#fefefe
| 465373 ||  || — || February 10, 2008 || Kitt Peak || Spacewatch || H || align=right data-sort-value="0.64" | 640 m || 
|-id=374 bgcolor=#E9E9E9
| 465374 ||  || — || February 12, 2008 || Kitt Peak || Spacewatch || — || align=right data-sort-value="0.67" | 670 m || 
|-id=375 bgcolor=#fefefe
| 465375 ||  || — || May 20, 2005 || Mount Lemmon || Mount Lemmon Survey || — || align=right data-sort-value="0.98" | 980 m || 
|-id=376 bgcolor=#fefefe
| 465376 ||  || — || February 12, 2004 || Kitt Peak || Spacewatch || — || align=right data-sort-value="0.58" | 580 m || 
|-id=377 bgcolor=#E9E9E9
| 465377 ||  || — || February 28, 2008 || Mount Lemmon || Mount Lemmon Survey || critical || align=right data-sort-value="0.75" | 750 m || 
|-id=378 bgcolor=#fefefe
| 465378 ||  || — || January 30, 2008 || Mount Lemmon || Mount Lemmon Survey || — || align=right data-sort-value="0.64" | 640 m || 
|-id=379 bgcolor=#fefefe
| 465379 ||  || — || March 10, 2008 || Mount Lemmon || Mount Lemmon Survey || H || align=right data-sort-value="0.74" | 740 m || 
|-id=380 bgcolor=#fefefe
| 465380 ||  || — || February 28, 2008 || Kitt Peak || Spacewatch || — || align=right data-sort-value="0.88" | 880 m || 
|-id=381 bgcolor=#E9E9E9
| 465381 ||  || — || March 13, 2008 || Kitt Peak || Spacewatch || — || align=right | 1.1 km || 
|-id=382 bgcolor=#E9E9E9
| 465382 ||  || — || March 9, 2008 || Kitt Peak || Spacewatch || — || align=right data-sort-value="0.77" | 770 m || 
|-id=383 bgcolor=#fefefe
| 465383 ||  || — || March 10, 2008 || Catalina || CSS || — || align=right | 1.0 km || 
|-id=384 bgcolor=#E9E9E9
| 465384 ||  || — || March 26, 2008 || Kitt Peak || Spacewatch || EUN || align=right data-sort-value="0.93" | 930 m || 
|-id=385 bgcolor=#fefefe
| 465385 ||  || — || March 27, 2008 || Kitt Peak || Spacewatch || — || align=right data-sort-value="0.91" | 910 m || 
|-id=386 bgcolor=#d6d6d6
| 465386 ||  || — || March 28, 2008 || Kitt Peak || Spacewatch || 3:2 || align=right | 4.1 km || 
|-id=387 bgcolor=#fefefe
| 465387 ||  || — || February 24, 2008 || Kitt Peak || Spacewatch || — || align=right data-sort-value="0.65" | 650 m || 
|-id=388 bgcolor=#E9E9E9
| 465388 ||  || — || March 5, 2008 || Mount Lemmon || Mount Lemmon Survey || — || align=right | 1.00 km || 
|-id=389 bgcolor=#fefefe
| 465389 ||  || — || March 28, 2008 || Mount Lemmon || Mount Lemmon Survey || H || align=right data-sort-value="0.54" | 540 m || 
|-id=390 bgcolor=#E9E9E9
| 465390 ||  || — || March 30, 2008 || Kitt Peak || Spacewatch || — || align=right data-sort-value="0.98" | 980 m || 
|-id=391 bgcolor=#E9E9E9
| 465391 ||  || — || March 28, 2008 || Kitt Peak || Spacewatch || — || align=right data-sort-value="0.91" | 910 m || 
|-id=392 bgcolor=#E9E9E9
| 465392 ||  || — || April 1, 2008 || Kitt Peak || Spacewatch || — || align=right data-sort-value="0.96" | 960 m || 
|-id=393 bgcolor=#E9E9E9
| 465393 ||  || — || April 1, 2008 || Mount Lemmon || Mount Lemmon Survey || — || align=right data-sort-value="0.73" | 730 m || 
|-id=394 bgcolor=#fefefe
| 465394 ||  || — || March 12, 2008 || Catalina || CSS || H || align=right data-sort-value="0.69" | 690 m || 
|-id=395 bgcolor=#E9E9E9
| 465395 ||  || — || April 4, 2008 || Kitt Peak || Spacewatch || BRG || align=right | 1.1 km || 
|-id=396 bgcolor=#E9E9E9
| 465396 ||  || — || April 4, 2008 || Kitt Peak || Spacewatch || MAR || align=right data-sort-value="0.95" | 950 m || 
|-id=397 bgcolor=#E9E9E9
| 465397 ||  || — || April 5, 2008 || Kitt Peak || Spacewatch || — || align=right | 1.1 km || 
|-id=398 bgcolor=#fefefe
| 465398 ||  || — || April 7, 2008 || Mount Lemmon || Mount Lemmon Survey || — || align=right data-sort-value="0.60" | 600 m || 
|-id=399 bgcolor=#E9E9E9
| 465399 ||  || — || March 30, 2008 || Kitt Peak || Spacewatch || — || align=right data-sort-value="0.85" | 850 m || 
|-id=400 bgcolor=#E9E9E9
| 465400 ||  || — || March 2, 2008 || Mount Lemmon || Mount Lemmon Survey || — || align=right | 1.6 km || 
|}

465401–465500 

|-bgcolor=#fefefe
| 465401 ||  || — || April 3, 2008 || Catalina || CSS || H || align=right data-sort-value="0.67" | 670 m || 
|-id=402 bgcolor=#FFC2E0
| 465402 ||  || — || March 30, 2008 || Catalina || CSS || APO +1km || align=right | 1.2 km || 
|-id=403 bgcolor=#E9E9E9
| 465403 ||  || — || April 9, 2008 || Kitt Peak || Spacewatch || — || align=right data-sort-value="0.91" | 910 m || 
|-id=404 bgcolor=#E9E9E9
| 465404 ||  || — || April 28, 2008 || Kitt Peak || Spacewatch || — || align=right data-sort-value="0.85" | 850 m || 
|-id=405 bgcolor=#E9E9E9
| 465405 ||  || — || April 24, 2008 || Kitt Peak || Spacewatch || — || align=right | 1.1 km || 
|-id=406 bgcolor=#E9E9E9
| 465406 ||  || — || April 30, 2008 || Mount Lemmon || Mount Lemmon Survey || — || align=right data-sort-value="0.75" | 750 m || 
|-id=407 bgcolor=#E9E9E9
| 465407 ||  || — || February 18, 2008 || Mount Lemmon || Mount Lemmon Survey || — || align=right | 1.9 km || 
|-id=408 bgcolor=#E9E9E9
| 465408 ||  || — || May 3, 2008 || Mount Lemmon || Mount Lemmon Survey || — || align=right data-sort-value="0.78" | 780 m || 
|-id=409 bgcolor=#E9E9E9
| 465409 ||  || — || April 29, 2008 || Kitt Peak || Spacewatch || — || align=right data-sort-value="0.71" | 710 m || 
|-id=410 bgcolor=#E9E9E9
| 465410 ||  || — || May 13, 2008 || Mount Lemmon || Mount Lemmon Survey || KON || align=right | 2.0 km || 
|-id=411 bgcolor=#E9E9E9
| 465411 ||  || — || May 14, 2008 || Mount Lemmon || Mount Lemmon Survey || — || align=right data-sort-value="0.95" | 950 m || 
|-id=412 bgcolor=#E9E9E9
| 465412 ||  || — || May 14, 2008 || Mount Lemmon || Mount Lemmon Survey || — || align=right data-sort-value="0.96" | 960 m || 
|-id=413 bgcolor=#E9E9E9
| 465413 ||  || — || May 27, 2008 || Kitt Peak || Spacewatch || — || align=right | 1.3 km || 
|-id=414 bgcolor=#E9E9E9
| 465414 ||  || — || May 14, 2008 || Kitt Peak || Spacewatch || — || align=right data-sort-value="0.93" | 930 m || 
|-id=415 bgcolor=#E9E9E9
| 465415 ||  || — || April 16, 2008 || Mount Lemmon || Mount Lemmon Survey || — || align=right | 1.1 km || 
|-id=416 bgcolor=#E9E9E9
| 465416 ||  || — || May 28, 2008 || Mount Lemmon || Mount Lemmon Survey || EUN || align=right | 1.1 km || 
|-id=417 bgcolor=#E9E9E9
| 465417 ||  || — || May 2, 2008 || Kitt Peak || Spacewatch || — || align=right | 1.8 km || 
|-id=418 bgcolor=#E9E9E9
| 465418 ||  || — || June 24, 2008 || Kitt Peak || Spacewatch || — || align=right data-sort-value="0.83" | 830 m || 
|-id=419 bgcolor=#E9E9E9
| 465419 ||  || — || July 25, 2008 || Siding Spring || SSS || — || align=right | 1.3 km || 
|-id=420 bgcolor=#E9E9E9
| 465420 ||  || — || July 29, 2008 || Kitt Peak || Spacewatch || — || align=right | 1.4 km || 
|-id=421 bgcolor=#E9E9E9
| 465421 || 2008 PF || — || August 1, 2008 || Črni Vrh || Črni Vrh || — || align=right | 1.6 km || 
|-id=422 bgcolor=#fefefe
| 465422 ||  || — || August 2, 2008 || La Sagra || OAM Obs. || H || align=right data-sort-value="0.62" | 620 m || 
|-id=423 bgcolor=#E9E9E9
| 465423 ||  || — || July 30, 2008 || Kitt Peak || Spacewatch || EUN || align=right | 1.3 km || 
|-id=424 bgcolor=#E9E9E9
| 465424 ||  || — || July 28, 2008 || Mount Lemmon || Mount Lemmon Survey || EUN || align=right | 1.3 km || 
|-id=425 bgcolor=#E9E9E9
| 465425 ||  || — || July 29, 2008 || Mount Lemmon || Mount Lemmon Survey || — || align=right | 1.2 km || 
|-id=426 bgcolor=#E9E9E9
| 465426 ||  || — || August 6, 2008 || Siding Spring || SSS || — || align=right | 1.6 km || 
|-id=427 bgcolor=#E9E9E9
| 465427 ||  || — || August 26, 2008 || Socorro || LINEAR || — || align=right | 2.0 km || 
|-id=428 bgcolor=#E9E9E9
| 465428 ||  || — || August 23, 2008 || Siding Spring || SSS || JUN || align=right | 1.3 km || 
|-id=429 bgcolor=#E9E9E9
| 465429 ||  || — || August 24, 2008 || Socorro || LINEAR || — || align=right | 2.2 km || 
|-id=430 bgcolor=#d6d6d6
| 465430 ||  || — || March 9, 2005 || Mount Lemmon || Mount Lemmon Survey || — || align=right | 2.4 km || 
|-id=431 bgcolor=#d6d6d6
| 465431 ||  || — || September 2, 2008 || Kitt Peak || Spacewatch || — || align=right | 2.8 km || 
|-id=432 bgcolor=#d6d6d6
| 465432 ||  || — || September 2, 2008 || Kitt Peak || Spacewatch || — || align=right | 2.4 km || 
|-id=433 bgcolor=#d6d6d6
| 465433 ||  || — || September 4, 2008 || Kitt Peak || Spacewatch || KOR || align=right | 1.1 km || 
|-id=434 bgcolor=#d6d6d6
| 465434 ||  || — || September 4, 2008 || Kitt Peak || Spacewatch || — || align=right | 2.2 km || 
|-id=435 bgcolor=#d6d6d6
| 465435 ||  || — || September 4, 2008 || Kitt Peak || Spacewatch || — || align=right | 2.3 km || 
|-id=436 bgcolor=#d6d6d6
| 465436 ||  || — || September 5, 2008 || Kitt Peak || Spacewatch || — || align=right | 2.6 km || 
|-id=437 bgcolor=#E9E9E9
| 465437 ||  || — || September 4, 2008 || Kitt Peak || Spacewatch || — || align=right | 2.4 km || 
|-id=438 bgcolor=#d6d6d6
| 465438 ||  || — || September 6, 2008 || Mount Lemmon || Mount Lemmon Survey || — || align=right | 2.9 km || 
|-id=439 bgcolor=#d6d6d6
| 465439 ||  || — || September 7, 2008 || Mount Lemmon || Mount Lemmon Survey || — || align=right | 2.9 km || 
|-id=440 bgcolor=#d6d6d6
| 465440 ||  || — || September 5, 2008 || Kitt Peak || Spacewatch || — || align=right | 2.3 km || 
|-id=441 bgcolor=#d6d6d6
| 465441 ||  || — || September 7, 2008 || Mount Lemmon || Mount Lemmon Survey || — || align=right | 2.2 km || 
|-id=442 bgcolor=#d6d6d6
| 465442 ||  || — || September 6, 2008 || Kitt Peak || Spacewatch || KOR || align=right | 1.2 km || 
|-id=443 bgcolor=#E9E9E9
| 465443 ||  || — || September 6, 2008 || La Sagra || OAM Obs. || JUN || align=right | 1.0 km || 
|-id=444 bgcolor=#E9E9E9
| 465444 ||  || — || September 8, 2008 || Siding Spring || SSS || — || align=right | 2.7 km || 
|-id=445 bgcolor=#d6d6d6
| 465445 ||  || — || September 6, 2008 || Mount Lemmon || Mount Lemmon Survey || — || align=right | 3.5 km || 
|-id=446 bgcolor=#E9E9E9
| 465446 ||  || — || September 9, 2008 || Mount Lemmon || Mount Lemmon Survey || — || align=right | 1.8 km || 
|-id=447 bgcolor=#E9E9E9
| 465447 ||  || — || July 29, 2008 || Kitt Peak || Spacewatch || — || align=right | 1.9 km || 
|-id=448 bgcolor=#E9E9E9
| 465448 ||  || — || September 6, 2008 || Mount Lemmon || Mount Lemmon Survey || — || align=right | 1.4 km || 
|-id=449 bgcolor=#d6d6d6
| 465449 ||  || — || September 19, 2008 || Kitt Peak || Spacewatch || — || align=right | 2.6 km || 
|-id=450 bgcolor=#d6d6d6
| 465450 ||  || — || September 19, 2008 || Kitt Peak || Spacewatch || Tj (2.97) || align=right | 2.9 km || 
|-id=451 bgcolor=#d6d6d6
| 465451 ||  || — || September 2, 2008 || Kitt Peak || Spacewatch || — || align=right | 2.3 km || 
|-id=452 bgcolor=#d6d6d6
| 465452 ||  || — || September 6, 2008 || Mount Lemmon || Mount Lemmon Survey || — || align=right | 2.5 km || 
|-id=453 bgcolor=#E9E9E9
| 465453 ||  || — || September 6, 2008 || Mount Lemmon || Mount Lemmon Survey || — || align=right | 2.9 km || 
|-id=454 bgcolor=#E9E9E9
| 465454 ||  || — || May 16, 2008 || Kitt Peak || Spacewatch || — || align=right | 1.7 km || 
|-id=455 bgcolor=#E9E9E9
| 465455 ||  || — || September 21, 2008 || Kitt Peak || Spacewatch || — || align=right | 2.0 km || 
|-id=456 bgcolor=#d6d6d6
| 465456 ||  || — || September 21, 2008 || Kitt Peak || Spacewatch || — || align=right | 2.4 km || 
|-id=457 bgcolor=#E9E9E9
| 465457 ||  || — || September 21, 2008 || Kitt Peak || Spacewatch || — || align=right | 2.7 km || 
|-id=458 bgcolor=#d6d6d6
| 465458 ||  || — || September 21, 2008 || Kitt Peak || Spacewatch || EOS || align=right | 1.7 km || 
|-id=459 bgcolor=#d6d6d6
| 465459 ||  || — || September 21, 2008 || Kitt Peak || Spacewatch || — || align=right | 2.6 km || 
|-id=460 bgcolor=#d6d6d6
| 465460 ||  || — || September 22, 2008 || Mount Lemmon || Mount Lemmon Survey || — || align=right | 2.1 km || 
|-id=461 bgcolor=#d6d6d6
| 465461 ||  || — || September 22, 2008 || Mount Lemmon || Mount Lemmon Survey || EOS || align=right | 1.5 km || 
|-id=462 bgcolor=#d6d6d6
| 465462 ||  || — || September 22, 2008 || Mount Lemmon || Mount Lemmon Survey || EOS || align=right | 1.7 km || 
|-id=463 bgcolor=#d6d6d6
| 465463 ||  || — || September 22, 2008 || Kitt Peak || Spacewatch || — || align=right | 2.3 km || 
|-id=464 bgcolor=#d6d6d6
| 465464 ||  || — || September 22, 2008 || Kitt Peak || Spacewatch || EOS || align=right | 1.9 km || 
|-id=465 bgcolor=#d6d6d6
| 465465 ||  || — || September 22, 2008 || Kitt Peak || Spacewatch || — || align=right | 2.6 km || 
|-id=466 bgcolor=#d6d6d6
| 465466 ||  || — || September 24, 2008 || Mount Lemmon || Mount Lemmon Survey || — || align=right | 2.7 km || 
|-id=467 bgcolor=#d6d6d6
| 465467 ||  || — || September 23, 2008 || Kitt Peak || Spacewatch || LIX || align=right | 3.1 km || 
|-id=468 bgcolor=#d6d6d6
| 465468 ||  || — || September 25, 2008 || Kitt Peak || Spacewatch || — || align=right | 3.3 km || 
|-id=469 bgcolor=#d6d6d6
| 465469 ||  || — || September 26, 2008 || Kitt Peak || Spacewatch || — || align=right | 2.7 km || 
|-id=470 bgcolor=#d6d6d6
| 465470 ||  || — || September 20, 2008 || Mount Lemmon || Mount Lemmon Survey || — || align=right | 2.1 km || 
|-id=471 bgcolor=#d6d6d6
| 465471 ||  || — || September 26, 2008 || Kitt Peak || Spacewatch || — || align=right | 2.8 km || 
|-id=472 bgcolor=#d6d6d6
| 465472 ||  || — || September 29, 2008 || Kitt Peak || Spacewatch || — || align=right | 2.2 km || 
|-id=473 bgcolor=#d6d6d6
| 465473 ||  || — || September 23, 2008 || Kitt Peak || Spacewatch || EOS || align=right | 1.8 km || 
|-id=474 bgcolor=#d6d6d6
| 465474 ||  || — || September 24, 2008 || Kitt Peak || Spacewatch || — || align=right | 2.8 km || 
|-id=475 bgcolor=#d6d6d6
| 465475 ||  || — || September 19, 2008 || Kitt Peak || Spacewatch || KOR || align=right | 1.4 km || 
|-id=476 bgcolor=#d6d6d6
| 465476 ||  || — || September 29, 2008 || Kitt Peak || Spacewatch || — || align=right | 2.4 km || 
|-id=477 bgcolor=#d6d6d6
| 465477 ||  || — || September 28, 2008 || Mount Lemmon || Mount Lemmon Survey || — || align=right | 2.3 km || 
|-id=478 bgcolor=#d6d6d6
| 465478 ||  || — || September 22, 2008 || Kitt Peak || Spacewatch || — || align=right | 2.4 km || 
|-id=479 bgcolor=#d6d6d6
| 465479 ||  || — || September 24, 2008 || Kitt Peak || Spacewatch || — || align=right | 3.1 km || 
|-id=480 bgcolor=#d6d6d6
| 465480 ||  || — || October 1, 2008 || Kitt Peak || Spacewatch || — || align=right | 3.7 km || 
|-id=481 bgcolor=#E9E9E9
| 465481 ||  || — || October 1, 2008 || Kitt Peak || Spacewatch || — || align=right | 2.1 km || 
|-id=482 bgcolor=#d6d6d6
| 465482 ||  || — || September 22, 2008 || Mount Lemmon || Mount Lemmon Survey || — || align=right | 2.1 km || 
|-id=483 bgcolor=#d6d6d6
| 465483 ||  || — || September 22, 2008 || Mount Lemmon || Mount Lemmon Survey || KOR || align=right | 1.4 km || 
|-id=484 bgcolor=#d6d6d6
| 465484 ||  || — || October 2, 2008 || Kitt Peak || Spacewatch || — || align=right | 2.4 km || 
|-id=485 bgcolor=#d6d6d6
| 465485 ||  || — || September 23, 2008 || Kitt Peak || Spacewatch || — || align=right | 2.6 km || 
|-id=486 bgcolor=#d6d6d6
| 465486 ||  || — || October 2, 2008 || Kitt Peak || Spacewatch || — || align=right | 2.4 km || 
|-id=487 bgcolor=#d6d6d6
| 465487 ||  || — || September 22, 2008 || Mount Lemmon || Mount Lemmon Survey || — || align=right | 2.3 km || 
|-id=488 bgcolor=#E9E9E9
| 465488 ||  || — || October 3, 2008 || Kitt Peak || Spacewatch || — || align=right | 1.8 km || 
|-id=489 bgcolor=#d6d6d6
| 465489 ||  || — || September 29, 2008 || Kitt Peak || Spacewatch || — || align=right | 2.1 km || 
|-id=490 bgcolor=#C2FFFF
| 465490 ||  || — || October 6, 2008 || Kitt Peak || Spacewatch || L4 || align=right | 7.3 km || 
|-id=491 bgcolor=#d6d6d6
| 465491 ||  || — || October 6, 2008 || Kitt Peak || Spacewatch || — || align=right | 2.0 km || 
|-id=492 bgcolor=#d6d6d6
| 465492 ||  || — || September 23, 2008 || Kitt Peak || Spacewatch || — || align=right | 2.9 km || 
|-id=493 bgcolor=#d6d6d6
| 465493 ||  || — || September 27, 2008 || Mount Lemmon || Mount Lemmon Survey || EOS || align=right | 1.9 km || 
|-id=494 bgcolor=#E9E9E9
| 465494 ||  || — || September 3, 2008 || Kitt Peak || Spacewatch || — || align=right | 2.0 km || 
|-id=495 bgcolor=#d6d6d6
| 465495 ||  || — || October 1, 2008 || Kitt Peak || Spacewatch || HYG || align=right | 1.9 km || 
|-id=496 bgcolor=#d6d6d6
| 465496 ||  || — || October 10, 2008 || Kitt Peak || Spacewatch || — || align=right | 2.7 km || 
|-id=497 bgcolor=#d6d6d6
| 465497 ||  || — || October 6, 2008 || Mount Lemmon || Mount Lemmon Survey || — || align=right | 2.6 km || 
|-id=498 bgcolor=#d6d6d6
| 465498 ||  || — || October 6, 2008 || Catalina || CSS || — || align=right | 3.4 km || 
|-id=499 bgcolor=#d6d6d6
| 465499 ||  || — || April 9, 2005 || Mount Lemmon || Mount Lemmon Survey || — || align=right | 3.7 km || 
|-id=500 bgcolor=#d6d6d6
| 465500 ||  || — || September 3, 2008 || Kitt Peak || Spacewatch || — || align=right | 2.4 km || 
|}

465501–465600 

|-bgcolor=#d6d6d6
| 465501 ||  || — || October 8, 2008 || Mount Lemmon || Mount Lemmon Survey || — || align=right | 2.0 km || 
|-id=502 bgcolor=#d6d6d6
| 465502 ||  || — || October 20, 2008 || Kitt Peak || Spacewatch || EOS || align=right | 2.0 km || 
|-id=503 bgcolor=#d6d6d6
| 465503 ||  || — || October 20, 2008 || Mount Lemmon || Mount Lemmon Survey || — || align=right | 3.6 km || 
|-id=504 bgcolor=#d6d6d6
| 465504 ||  || — || September 23, 2008 || Mount Lemmon || Mount Lemmon Survey || — || align=right | 3.4 km || 
|-id=505 bgcolor=#d6d6d6
| 465505 ||  || — || October 20, 2008 || Kitt Peak || Spacewatch || — || align=right | 3.6 km || 
|-id=506 bgcolor=#d6d6d6
| 465506 ||  || — || October 7, 2008 || Mount Lemmon || Mount Lemmon Survey || — || align=right | 2.5 km || 
|-id=507 bgcolor=#d6d6d6
| 465507 ||  || — || October 21, 2008 || Kitt Peak || Spacewatch || — || align=right | 3.0 km || 
|-id=508 bgcolor=#d6d6d6
| 465508 ||  || — || October 21, 2008 || Kitt Peak || Spacewatch || EOS || align=right | 2.2 km || 
|-id=509 bgcolor=#d6d6d6
| 465509 ||  || — || October 22, 2008 || Kitt Peak || Spacewatch || — || align=right | 2.4 km || 
|-id=510 bgcolor=#d6d6d6
| 465510 ||  || — || October 24, 2008 || Mount Lemmon || Mount Lemmon Survey || — || align=right | 1.8 km || 
|-id=511 bgcolor=#d6d6d6
| 465511 ||  || — || October 22, 2008 || Kitt Peak || Spacewatch || — || align=right | 2.3 km || 
|-id=512 bgcolor=#d6d6d6
| 465512 ||  || — || October 22, 2008 || Kitt Peak || Spacewatch || — || align=right | 3.2 km || 
|-id=513 bgcolor=#E9E9E9
| 465513 Chenchen ||  ||  || October 22, 2008 || Lulin || X. Y. Hsiao, Q.-z. Ye || — || align=right | 2.7 km || 
|-id=514 bgcolor=#d6d6d6
| 465514 ||  || — || October 1, 2008 || Mount Lemmon || Mount Lemmon Survey || EOS || align=right | 2.0 km || 
|-id=515 bgcolor=#d6d6d6
| 465515 ||  || — || September 9, 2008 || Mount Lemmon || Mount Lemmon Survey || — || align=right | 2.9 km || 
|-id=516 bgcolor=#d6d6d6
| 465516 ||  || — || October 23, 2008 || Kitt Peak || Spacewatch || VER || align=right | 2.7 km || 
|-id=517 bgcolor=#d6d6d6
| 465517 ||  || — || October 23, 2008 || Kitt Peak || Spacewatch || KOR || align=right | 1.1 km || 
|-id=518 bgcolor=#d6d6d6
| 465518 ||  || — || October 23, 2008 || Kitt Peak || Spacewatch || — || align=right | 2.3 km || 
|-id=519 bgcolor=#d6d6d6
| 465519 ||  || — || October 23, 2008 || Kitt Peak || Spacewatch || — || align=right | 4.8 km || 
|-id=520 bgcolor=#d6d6d6
| 465520 ||  || — || October 23, 2008 || Kitt Peak || Spacewatch || — || align=right | 2.4 km || 
|-id=521 bgcolor=#d6d6d6
| 465521 ||  || — || September 24, 2008 || Mount Lemmon || Mount Lemmon Survey || EOS || align=right | 1.6 km || 
|-id=522 bgcolor=#d6d6d6
| 465522 ||  || — || October 24, 2008 || Mount Lemmon || Mount Lemmon Survey || — || align=right | 2.9 km || 
|-id=523 bgcolor=#d6d6d6
| 465523 ||  || — || October 24, 2008 || Kitt Peak || Spacewatch || — || align=right | 2.5 km || 
|-id=524 bgcolor=#d6d6d6
| 465524 ||  || — || October 24, 2008 || Mount Lemmon || Mount Lemmon Survey || — || align=right | 2.6 km || 
|-id=525 bgcolor=#d6d6d6
| 465525 ||  || — || September 11, 2007 || Kitt Peak || Spacewatch || — || align=right | 2.6 km || 
|-id=526 bgcolor=#d6d6d6
| 465526 ||  || — || September 27, 2008 || Mount Lemmon || Mount Lemmon Survey || — || align=right | 3.1 km || 
|-id=527 bgcolor=#d6d6d6
| 465527 ||  || — || October 27, 2008 || Mount Lemmon || Mount Lemmon Survey || — || align=right | 2.3 km || 
|-id=528 bgcolor=#d6d6d6
| 465528 ||  || — || October 23, 2008 || Cerro Burek || Alianza S4 Obs. || — || align=right | 2.9 km || 
|-id=529 bgcolor=#d6d6d6
| 465529 ||  || — || October 26, 2008 || Kitt Peak || Spacewatch || EOS || align=right | 2.4 km || 
|-id=530 bgcolor=#d6d6d6
| 465530 ||  || — || October 26, 2008 || Kitt Peak || Spacewatch || — || align=right | 4.6 km || 
|-id=531 bgcolor=#d6d6d6
| 465531 ||  || — || October 26, 2008 || Kitt Peak || Spacewatch || — || align=right | 3.1 km || 
|-id=532 bgcolor=#d6d6d6
| 465532 ||  || — || October 27, 2008 || Kitt Peak || Spacewatch || — || align=right | 3.5 km || 
|-id=533 bgcolor=#d6d6d6
| 465533 ||  || — || October 27, 2008 || Kitt Peak || Spacewatch || — || align=right | 2.7 km || 
|-id=534 bgcolor=#d6d6d6
| 465534 ||  || — || September 23, 2008 || Mount Lemmon || Mount Lemmon Survey || — || align=right | 2.3 km || 
|-id=535 bgcolor=#d6d6d6
| 465535 ||  || — || October 28, 2008 || Kitt Peak || Spacewatch || — || align=right | 2.1 km || 
|-id=536 bgcolor=#d6d6d6
| 465536 ||  || — || October 28, 2008 || Mount Lemmon || Mount Lemmon Survey || — || align=right | 1.8 km || 
|-id=537 bgcolor=#d6d6d6
| 465537 ||  || — || September 29, 2008 || Mount Lemmon || Mount Lemmon Survey || — || align=right | 2.9 km || 
|-id=538 bgcolor=#d6d6d6
| 465538 ||  || — || September 29, 2008 || Kitt Peak || Spacewatch || — || align=right | 2.8 km || 
|-id=539 bgcolor=#d6d6d6
| 465539 ||  || — || October 30, 2008 || Kitt Peak || Spacewatch || EOS || align=right | 1.5 km || 
|-id=540 bgcolor=#d6d6d6
| 465540 ||  || — || September 28, 2008 || Mount Lemmon || Mount Lemmon Survey || EOS || align=right | 1.8 km || 
|-id=541 bgcolor=#d6d6d6
| 465541 ||  || — || October 25, 2008 || Kitt Peak || Spacewatch || EOS || align=right | 1.9 km || 
|-id=542 bgcolor=#d6d6d6
| 465542 ||  || — || October 27, 2008 || Mount Lemmon || Mount Lemmon Survey || — || align=right | 2.2 km || 
|-id=543 bgcolor=#d6d6d6
| 465543 ||  || — || October 27, 2008 || Mount Lemmon || Mount Lemmon Survey || — || align=right | 2.0 km || 
|-id=544 bgcolor=#d6d6d6
| 465544 ||  || — || October 28, 2008 || Kitt Peak || Spacewatch || — || align=right | 2.4 km || 
|-id=545 bgcolor=#d6d6d6
| 465545 ||  || — || October 27, 2008 || Kitt Peak || Spacewatch || — || align=right | 3.6 km || 
|-id=546 bgcolor=#d6d6d6
| 465546 ||  || — || November 2, 2008 || Catalina || CSS || — || align=right | 3.4 km || 
|-id=547 bgcolor=#d6d6d6
| 465547 ||  || — || November 2, 2008 || Mount Lemmon || Mount Lemmon Survey || LIX || align=right | 3.2 km || 
|-id=548 bgcolor=#fefefe
| 465548 ||  || — || October 22, 2008 || Kitt Peak || Spacewatch || — || align=right data-sort-value="0.59" | 590 m || 
|-id=549 bgcolor=#d6d6d6
| 465549 ||  || — || November 3, 2008 || Kitt Peak || Spacewatch || — || align=right | 2.3 km || 
|-id=550 bgcolor=#d6d6d6
| 465550 ||  || — || November 3, 2008 || Mount Lemmon || Mount Lemmon Survey || — || align=right | 2.5 km || 
|-id=551 bgcolor=#d6d6d6
| 465551 ||  || — || October 30, 2008 || Kitt Peak || Spacewatch || — || align=right | 3.1 km || 
|-id=552 bgcolor=#d6d6d6
| 465552 ||  || — || September 22, 2008 || Mount Lemmon || Mount Lemmon Survey || EOS || align=right | 1.9 km || 
|-id=553 bgcolor=#d6d6d6
| 465553 ||  || — || November 1, 2008 || Mount Lemmon || Mount Lemmon Survey || — || align=right | 2.2 km || 
|-id=554 bgcolor=#d6d6d6
| 465554 ||  || — || October 23, 2008 || Kitt Peak || Spacewatch || — || align=right | 3.6 km || 
|-id=555 bgcolor=#d6d6d6
| 465555 ||  || — || October 28, 2008 || Mount Lemmon || Mount Lemmon Survey || HYG || align=right | 2.1 km || 
|-id=556 bgcolor=#d6d6d6
| 465556 ||  || — || November 19, 2008 || Mount Lemmon || Mount Lemmon Survey || — || align=right | 3.0 km || 
|-id=557 bgcolor=#d6d6d6
| 465557 ||  || — || October 23, 2008 || Kitt Peak || Spacewatch || — || align=right | 3.0 km || 
|-id=558 bgcolor=#d6d6d6
| 465558 ||  || — || October 20, 2008 || Mount Lemmon || Mount Lemmon Survey || — || align=right | 2.7 km || 
|-id=559 bgcolor=#d6d6d6
| 465559 ||  || — || November 17, 2008 || Kitt Peak || Spacewatch || — || align=right | 4.1 km || 
|-id=560 bgcolor=#d6d6d6
| 465560 ||  || — || November 18, 2008 || Kitt Peak || Spacewatch || — || align=right | 2.7 km || 
|-id=561 bgcolor=#d6d6d6
| 465561 ||  || — || November 20, 2008 || Kitt Peak || Spacewatch || VER || align=right | 2.5 km || 
|-id=562 bgcolor=#d6d6d6
| 465562 ||  || — || November 20, 2008 || Kitt Peak || Spacewatch || — || align=right | 2.5 km || 
|-id=563 bgcolor=#d6d6d6
| 465563 ||  || — || November 1, 2008 || Mount Lemmon || Mount Lemmon Survey || — || align=right | 2.3 km || 
|-id=564 bgcolor=#d6d6d6
| 465564 ||  || — || June 25, 2007 || Kitt Peak || Spacewatch || — || align=right | 2.2 km || 
|-id=565 bgcolor=#d6d6d6
| 465565 ||  || — || October 7, 2008 || Mount Lemmon || Mount Lemmon Survey || — || align=right | 3.6 km || 
|-id=566 bgcolor=#d6d6d6
| 465566 ||  || — || October 21, 2008 || Kitt Peak || Spacewatch || — || align=right | 3.1 km || 
|-id=567 bgcolor=#d6d6d6
| 465567 ||  || — || September 5, 2008 || Kitt Peak || Spacewatch || — || align=right | 3.0 km || 
|-id=568 bgcolor=#fefefe
| 465568 ||  || — || October 28, 2008 || Kitt Peak || Spacewatch || — || align=right data-sort-value="0.50" | 500 m || 
|-id=569 bgcolor=#d6d6d6
| 465569 ||  || — || November 18, 2008 || Kitt Peak || Spacewatch || — || align=right | 2.8 km || 
|-id=570 bgcolor=#d6d6d6
| 465570 ||  || — || September 3, 2008 || Kitt Peak || Spacewatch || — || align=right | 3.9 km || 
|-id=571 bgcolor=#d6d6d6
| 465571 ||  || — || November 19, 2008 || Mount Lemmon || Mount Lemmon Survey || THM || align=right | 1.7 km || 
|-id=572 bgcolor=#d6d6d6
| 465572 ||  || — || November 19, 2008 || Mount Lemmon || Mount Lemmon Survey || — || align=right | 3.6 km || 
|-id=573 bgcolor=#d6d6d6
| 465573 ||  || — || November 22, 2008 || Kitt Peak || Spacewatch || — || align=right | 2.7 km || 
|-id=574 bgcolor=#d6d6d6
| 465574 ||  || — || November 30, 2008 || Kitt Peak || Spacewatch || — || align=right | 3.0 km || 
|-id=575 bgcolor=#d6d6d6
| 465575 ||  || — || November 30, 2008 || Socorro || LINEAR || — || align=right | 3.4 km || 
|-id=576 bgcolor=#d6d6d6
| 465576 ||  || — || November 6, 2008 || Kitt Peak || Spacewatch || — || align=right | 2.9 km || 
|-id=577 bgcolor=#d6d6d6
| 465577 ||  || — || December 4, 2008 || Kitt Peak || Spacewatch || HYG || align=right | 2.7 km || 
|-id=578 bgcolor=#d6d6d6
| 465578 ||  || — || October 23, 2008 || Mount Lemmon || Mount Lemmon Survey || — || align=right | 3.2 km || 
|-id=579 bgcolor=#d6d6d6
| 465579 ||  || — || December 24, 2008 || Dauban || F. Kugel || — || align=right | 3.2 km || 
|-id=580 bgcolor=#d6d6d6
| 465580 ||  || — || November 6, 2008 || Mount Lemmon || Mount Lemmon Survey || — || align=right | 3.2 km || 
|-id=581 bgcolor=#fefefe
| 465581 ||  || — || December 22, 2008 || Kitt Peak || Spacewatch || — || align=right data-sort-value="0.61" | 610 m || 
|-id=582 bgcolor=#d6d6d6
| 465582 ||  || — || December 30, 2008 || Kitt Peak || Spacewatch || — || align=right | 3.2 km || 
|-id=583 bgcolor=#d6d6d6
| 465583 ||  || — || December 29, 2008 || Kitt Peak || Spacewatch || — || align=right | 2.9 km || 
|-id=584 bgcolor=#fefefe
| 465584 ||  || — || December 29, 2008 || Kitt Peak || Spacewatch || — || align=right data-sort-value="0.64" | 640 m || 
|-id=585 bgcolor=#d6d6d6
| 465585 ||  || — || December 31, 2008 || Kitt Peak || Spacewatch || — || align=right | 3.1 km || 
|-id=586 bgcolor=#fefefe
| 465586 ||  || — || December 31, 2008 || Kitt Peak || Spacewatch || — || align=right data-sort-value="0.53" | 530 m || 
|-id=587 bgcolor=#d6d6d6
| 465587 ||  || — || October 31, 2008 || Mount Lemmon || Mount Lemmon Survey || — || align=right | 3.0 km || 
|-id=588 bgcolor=#fefefe
| 465588 ||  || — || December 21, 2008 || Kitt Peak || Spacewatch || — || align=right data-sort-value="0.50" | 500 m || 
|-id=589 bgcolor=#fefefe
| 465589 ||  || — || December 21, 2008 || Kitt Peak || Spacewatch || — || align=right data-sort-value="0.60" | 600 m || 
|-id=590 bgcolor=#fefefe
| 465590 ||  || — || December 22, 2008 || Mount Lemmon || Mount Lemmon Survey || — || align=right data-sort-value="0.68" | 680 m || 
|-id=591 bgcolor=#fefefe
| 465591 ||  || — || January 3, 2009 || Kitt Peak || Spacewatch || — || align=right data-sort-value="0.59" | 590 m || 
|-id=592 bgcolor=#fefefe
| 465592 ||  || — || January 2, 2009 || Kitt Peak || Spacewatch || — || align=right data-sort-value="0.57" | 570 m || 
|-id=593 bgcolor=#d6d6d6
| 465593 ||  || — || January 16, 2009 || Kitt Peak || Spacewatch || — || align=right | 3.0 km || 
|-id=594 bgcolor=#d6d6d6
| 465594 ||  || — || January 16, 2009 || Kitt Peak || Spacewatch || — || align=right | 4.2 km || 
|-id=595 bgcolor=#fefefe
| 465595 ||  || — || December 30, 2008 || Mount Lemmon || Mount Lemmon Survey || — || align=right data-sort-value="0.73" | 730 m || 
|-id=596 bgcolor=#fefefe
| 465596 ||  || — || January 29, 2009 || Kitt Peak || Spacewatch || — || align=right data-sort-value="0.66" | 660 m || 
|-id=597 bgcolor=#fefefe
| 465597 ||  || — || January 29, 2009 || Kitt Peak || Spacewatch || — || align=right data-sort-value="0.51" | 510 m || 
|-id=598 bgcolor=#fefefe
| 465598 ||  || — || January 29, 2009 || Kitt Peak || Spacewatch || — || align=right data-sort-value="0.72" | 720 m || 
|-id=599 bgcolor=#fefefe
| 465599 ||  || — || January 30, 2009 || Kitt Peak || Spacewatch || — || align=right data-sort-value="0.57" | 570 m || 
|-id=600 bgcolor=#fefefe
| 465600 ||  || — || January 18, 2009 || Kitt Peak || Spacewatch || — || align=right data-sort-value="0.55" | 550 m || 
|}

465601–465700 

|-bgcolor=#d6d6d6
| 465601 ||  || — || January 16, 2009 || Socorro || LINEAR || — || align=right | 3.6 km || 
|-id=602 bgcolor=#fefefe
| 465602 ||  || — || February 1, 2009 || Mount Lemmon || Mount Lemmon Survey || — || align=right data-sort-value="0.71" | 710 m || 
|-id=603 bgcolor=#fefefe
| 465603 ||  || — || February 1, 2009 || Kitt Peak || Spacewatch || — || align=right data-sort-value="0.82" | 820 m || 
|-id=604 bgcolor=#fefefe
| 465604 ||  || — || February 14, 2009 || Mount Lemmon || Mount Lemmon Survey || — || align=right data-sort-value="0.60" | 600 m || 
|-id=605 bgcolor=#d6d6d6
| 465605 ||  || — || February 20, 2009 || Mount Lemmon || Mount Lemmon Survey || — || align=right | 3.9 km || 
|-id=606 bgcolor=#fefefe
| 465606 ||  || — || February 14, 2009 || Kitt Peak || Spacewatch || — || align=right data-sort-value="0.74" | 740 m || 
|-id=607 bgcolor=#fefefe
| 465607 ||  || — || September 11, 2007 || Mount Lemmon || Mount Lemmon Survey || — || align=right data-sort-value="0.69" | 690 m || 
|-id=608 bgcolor=#d6d6d6
| 465608 ||  || — || February 19, 2009 || Kitt Peak || Spacewatch || 7:4 || align=right | 3.2 km || 
|-id=609 bgcolor=#fefefe
| 465609 ||  || — || February 19, 2009 || Kitt Peak || Spacewatch || (2076) || align=right data-sort-value="0.62" | 620 m || 
|-id=610 bgcolor=#fefefe
| 465610 ||  || — || February 1, 2009 || Mount Lemmon || Mount Lemmon Survey || — || align=right data-sort-value="0.58" | 580 m || 
|-id=611 bgcolor=#fefefe
| 465611 ||  || — || February 19, 2009 || Kitt Peak || Spacewatch || — || align=right data-sort-value="0.69" | 690 m || 
|-id=612 bgcolor=#fefefe
| 465612 ||  || — || October 23, 2004 || Kitt Peak || Spacewatch || — || align=right data-sort-value="0.52" | 520 m || 
|-id=613 bgcolor=#fefefe
| 465613 ||  || — || February 19, 2009 || Kitt Peak || Spacewatch || NYS || align=right data-sort-value="0.44" | 440 m || 
|-id=614 bgcolor=#fefefe
| 465614 ||  || — || February 28, 2009 || Kitt Peak || Spacewatch || — || align=right data-sort-value="0.74" | 740 m || 
|-id=615 bgcolor=#fefefe
| 465615 ||  || — || February 28, 2009 || Kitt Peak || Spacewatch || — || align=right data-sort-value="0.76" | 760 m || 
|-id=616 bgcolor=#FFC2E0
| 465616 ||  || — || March 1, 2009 || Catalina || CSS || AMO || align=right data-sort-value="0.60" | 600 m || 
|-id=617 bgcolor=#FFC2E0
| 465617 ||  || — || March 2, 2009 || Mount Lemmon || Mount Lemmon Survey || APOPHA || align=right data-sort-value="0.19" | 190 m || 
|-id=618 bgcolor=#fefefe
| 465618 ||  || — || March 2, 2009 || Mount Lemmon || Mount Lemmon Survey || — || align=right data-sort-value="0.68" | 680 m || 
|-id=619 bgcolor=#FA8072
| 465619 ||  || — || March 18, 2009 || Siding Spring || SSS || — || align=right data-sort-value="0.64" | 640 m || 
|-id=620 bgcolor=#fefefe
| 465620 ||  || — || March 1, 2009 || Kitt Peak || Spacewatch || — || align=right data-sort-value="0.69" | 690 m || 
|-id=621 bgcolor=#fefefe
| 465621 ||  || — || March 28, 2009 || Kitt Peak || Spacewatch || — || align=right data-sort-value="0.63" | 630 m || 
|-id=622 bgcolor=#d6d6d6
| 465622 ||  || — || March 29, 2009 || Kitt Peak || Spacewatch || 7:4 || align=right | 2.9 km || 
|-id=623 bgcolor=#fefefe
| 465623 ||  || — || February 20, 2009 || Kitt Peak || Spacewatch || — || align=right data-sort-value="0.58" | 580 m || 
|-id=624 bgcolor=#fefefe
| 465624 ||  || — || March 16, 2009 || Mount Lemmon || Mount Lemmon Survey || — || align=right data-sort-value="0.85" | 850 m || 
|-id=625 bgcolor=#fefefe
| 465625 ||  || — || November 5, 2007 || Mount Lemmon || Mount Lemmon Survey || — || align=right data-sort-value="0.70" | 700 m || 
|-id=626 bgcolor=#fefefe
| 465626 ||  || — || April 17, 2009 || Kitt Peak || Spacewatch || — || align=right data-sort-value="0.73" | 730 m || 
|-id=627 bgcolor=#fefefe
| 465627 ||  || — || April 17, 2009 || Kitt Peak || Spacewatch || — || align=right data-sort-value="0.78" | 780 m || 
|-id=628 bgcolor=#fefefe
| 465628 ||  || — || April 19, 2009 || Kitt Peak || Spacewatch || — || align=right data-sort-value="0.89" | 890 m || 
|-id=629 bgcolor=#fefefe
| 465629 ||  || — || April 2, 2009 || Mount Lemmon || Mount Lemmon Survey || V || align=right data-sort-value="0.52" | 520 m || 
|-id=630 bgcolor=#fefefe
| 465630 ||  || — || March 31, 2009 || Mount Lemmon || Mount Lemmon Survey || — || align=right data-sort-value="0.87" | 870 m || 
|-id=631 bgcolor=#fefefe
| 465631 ||  || — || April 30, 2009 || Kitt Peak || Spacewatch || — || align=right data-sort-value="0.68" | 680 m || 
|-id=632 bgcolor=#fefefe
| 465632 ||  || — || May 13, 2009 || Tzec Maun || F. Tozzi || — || align=right | 1.1 km || 
|-id=633 bgcolor=#FFC2E0
| 465633 ||  || — || May 15, 2009 || Kitt Peak || Spacewatch || APOPHA || align=right data-sort-value="0.30" | 300 m || 
|-id=634 bgcolor=#fefefe
| 465634 ||  || — || May 4, 2009 || Mount Lemmon || Mount Lemmon Survey || — || align=right data-sort-value="0.65" | 650 m || 
|-id=635 bgcolor=#fefefe
| 465635 ||  || — || May 14, 2009 || Kitt Peak || Spacewatch || — || align=right data-sort-value="0.64" | 640 m || 
|-id=636 bgcolor=#fefefe
| 465636 ||  || — || April 23, 2009 || Kitt Peak || Spacewatch || — || align=right data-sort-value="0.66" | 660 m || 
|-id=637 bgcolor=#fefefe
| 465637 ||  || — || April 30, 2009 || Kitt Peak || Spacewatch || — || align=right data-sort-value="0.67" | 670 m || 
|-id=638 bgcolor=#fefefe
| 465638 ||  || — || April 20, 2009 || Kitt Peak || Spacewatch || — || align=right data-sort-value="0.77" | 770 m || 
|-id=639 bgcolor=#fefefe
| 465639 ||  || — || June 15, 2009 || Mount Lemmon || Mount Lemmon Survey || — || align=right | 1.0 km || 
|-id=640 bgcolor=#fefefe
| 465640 ||  || — || May 29, 2005 || Campo Imperatore || CINEOS || — || align=right | 1.0 km || 
|-id=641 bgcolor=#fefefe
| 465641 ||  || — || July 30, 2009 || Kitt Peak || Spacewatch || — || align=right | 1.0 km || 
|-id=642 bgcolor=#fefefe
| 465642 ||  || — || August 15, 2009 || Kitt Peak || Spacewatch || — || align=right data-sort-value="0.89" | 890 m || 
|-id=643 bgcolor=#fefefe
| 465643 ||  || — || August 15, 2009 || Kitt Peak || Spacewatch || — || align=right data-sort-value="0.62" | 620 m || 
|-id=644 bgcolor=#fefefe
| 465644 ||  || — || July 31, 2009 || Kitt Peak || Spacewatch || — || align=right data-sort-value="0.68" | 680 m || 
|-id=645 bgcolor=#E9E9E9
| 465645 ||  || — || August 16, 2009 || Catalina || CSS || — || align=right data-sort-value="0.96" | 960 m || 
|-id=646 bgcolor=#E9E9E9
| 465646 ||  || — || August 16, 2009 || Kitt Peak || Spacewatch || — || align=right | 1.3 km || 
|-id=647 bgcolor=#fefefe
| 465647 ||  || — || August 19, 2009 || Hibiscus || N. Teamo || — || align=right data-sort-value="0.58" | 580 m || 
|-id=648 bgcolor=#E9E9E9
| 465648 ||  || — || August 20, 2009 || Kitt Peak || Spacewatch || — || align=right | 1.3 km || 
|-id=649 bgcolor=#E9E9E9
| 465649 ||  || — || August 20, 2009 || Kitt Peak || Spacewatch || — || align=right | 1.1 km || 
|-id=650 bgcolor=#C2FFFF
| 465650 ||  || — || September 12, 2009 || Kitt Peak || Spacewatch || L4 || align=right | 8.6 km || 
|-id=651 bgcolor=#E9E9E9
| 465651 ||  || — || September 12, 2009 || Kitt Peak || Spacewatch || EUN || align=right | 1.3 km || 
|-id=652 bgcolor=#C2FFFF
| 465652 ||  || — || September 14, 2009 || Kitt Peak || Spacewatch || L4 || align=right | 9.2 km || 
|-id=653 bgcolor=#E9E9E9
| 465653 ||  || — || September 14, 2009 || Kitt Peak || Spacewatch || — || align=right | 2.1 km || 
|-id=654 bgcolor=#E9E9E9
| 465654 ||  || — || September 15, 2009 || Kitt Peak || Spacewatch || — || align=right | 1.5 km || 
|-id=655 bgcolor=#E9E9E9
| 465655 ||  || — || September 15, 2009 || Kitt Peak || Spacewatch || — || align=right | 2.0 km || 
|-id=656 bgcolor=#E9E9E9
| 465656 ||  || — || September 15, 2009 || Kitt Peak || Spacewatch || — || align=right | 1.1 km || 
|-id=657 bgcolor=#E9E9E9
| 465657 ||  || — || September 15, 2009 || Kitt Peak || Spacewatch || — || align=right | 1.6 km || 
|-id=658 bgcolor=#C2FFFF
| 465658 ||  || — || September 12, 2009 || Kitt Peak || Spacewatch || L4 || align=right | 11 km || 
|-id=659 bgcolor=#E9E9E9
| 465659 ||  || — || September 15, 2009 || Kitt Peak || Spacewatch || — || align=right | 2.5 km || 
|-id=660 bgcolor=#E9E9E9
| 465660 ||  || — || September 12, 2009 || Kitt Peak || Spacewatch || — || align=right | 2.0 km || 
|-id=661 bgcolor=#E9E9E9
| 465661 ||  || — || September 15, 2009 || Kitt Peak || Spacewatch || WIT || align=right data-sort-value="0.82" | 820 m || 
|-id=662 bgcolor=#E9E9E9
| 465662 ||  || — || September 16, 2009 || Mount Lemmon || Mount Lemmon Survey || — || align=right | 1.00 km || 
|-id=663 bgcolor=#E9E9E9
| 465663 ||  || — || September 16, 2009 || Kitt Peak || Spacewatch || — || align=right | 3.0 km || 
|-id=664 bgcolor=#E9E9E9
| 465664 ||  || — || September 16, 2009 || Kitt Peak || Spacewatch || — || align=right | 1.3 km || 
|-id=665 bgcolor=#E9E9E9
| 465665 ||  || — || September 17, 2009 || Kitt Peak || Spacewatch || — || align=right | 1.8 km || 
|-id=666 bgcolor=#E9E9E9
| 465666 ||  || — || September 17, 2009 || Mount Lemmon || Mount Lemmon Survey || — || align=right | 2.0 km || 
|-id=667 bgcolor=#E9E9E9
| 465667 ||  || — || September 17, 2009 || Kitt Peak || Spacewatch || — || align=right | 2.4 km || 
|-id=668 bgcolor=#E9E9E9
| 465668 ||  || — || September 17, 2009 || Kitt Peak || Spacewatch || — || align=right | 1.4 km || 
|-id=669 bgcolor=#E9E9E9
| 465669 ||  || — || April 7, 2003 || Kitt Peak || Spacewatch || — || align=right | 1.4 km || 
|-id=670 bgcolor=#E9E9E9
| 465670 ||  || — || August 30, 2005 || Kitt Peak || Spacewatch || — || align=right data-sort-value="0.58" | 580 m || 
|-id=671 bgcolor=#E9E9E9
| 465671 ||  || — || September 18, 2009 || Kitt Peak || Spacewatch || — || align=right data-sort-value="0.91" | 910 m || 
|-id=672 bgcolor=#E9E9E9
| 465672 ||  || — || September 16, 2009 || Kitt Peak || Spacewatch || — || align=right | 1.6 km || 
|-id=673 bgcolor=#E9E9E9
| 465673 ||  || — || September 16, 2009 || Mount Lemmon || Mount Lemmon Survey || — || align=right | 1.6 km || 
|-id=674 bgcolor=#E9E9E9
| 465674 ||  || — || April 5, 2003 || Kitt Peak || Spacewatch || — || align=right | 1.7 km || 
|-id=675 bgcolor=#E9E9E9
| 465675 ||  || — || September 18, 2009 || Kitt Peak || Spacewatch || — || align=right | 2.1 km || 
|-id=676 bgcolor=#fefefe
| 465676 ||  || — || September 20, 2009 || Kitt Peak || Spacewatch || H || align=right data-sort-value="0.64" | 640 m || 
|-id=677 bgcolor=#E9E9E9
| 465677 ||  || — || September 12, 2009 || Kitt Peak || Spacewatch || — || align=right | 1.9 km || 
|-id=678 bgcolor=#E9E9E9
| 465678 ||  || — || September 22, 2009 || Kitt Peak || Spacewatch || — || align=right | 1.4 km || 
|-id=679 bgcolor=#E9E9E9
| 465679 ||  || — || September 22, 2009 || Kitt Peak || Spacewatch || — || align=right | 1.7 km || 
|-id=680 bgcolor=#E9E9E9
| 465680 ||  || — || September 22, 2009 || Kitt Peak || Spacewatch || MAR || align=right data-sort-value="0.93" | 930 m || 
|-id=681 bgcolor=#E9E9E9
| 465681 ||  || — || September 18, 2009 || Kitt Peak || Spacewatch || — || align=right | 2.0 km || 
|-id=682 bgcolor=#E9E9E9
| 465682 ||  || — || September 23, 2009 || Kitt Peak || Spacewatch || — || align=right | 1.6 km || 
|-id=683 bgcolor=#E9E9E9
| 465683 ||  || — || September 23, 2009 || Kitt Peak || Spacewatch || EUN || align=right | 1.1 km || 
|-id=684 bgcolor=#E9E9E9
| 465684 ||  || — || September 23, 2009 || Kitt Peak || Spacewatch || — || align=right | 1.6 km || 
|-id=685 bgcolor=#E9E9E9
| 465685 ||  || — || September 15, 2009 || Kitt Peak || Spacewatch || — || align=right | 1.7 km || 
|-id=686 bgcolor=#E9E9E9
| 465686 ||  || — || September 19, 2009 || Catalina || CSS || — || align=right | 2.2 km || 
|-id=687 bgcolor=#E9E9E9
| 465687 ||  || — || August 29, 2009 || Catalina || CSS || — || align=right | 1.7 km || 
|-id=688 bgcolor=#C2FFFF
| 465688 ||  || — || September 21, 2009 || Mount Lemmon || Mount Lemmon Survey || L4 || align=right | 7.1 km || 
|-id=689 bgcolor=#E9E9E9
| 465689 ||  || — || September 24, 2009 || Kitt Peak || Spacewatch || — || align=right | 1.3 km || 
|-id=690 bgcolor=#E9E9E9
| 465690 ||  || — || September 24, 2009 || Kitt Peak || Spacewatch || — || align=right | 1.3 km || 
|-id=691 bgcolor=#E9E9E9
| 465691 ||  || — || September 16, 2009 || Kitt Peak || Spacewatch || — || align=right | 1.0 km || 
|-id=692 bgcolor=#E9E9E9
| 465692 ||  || — || August 18, 2009 || Kitt Peak || Spacewatch || — || align=right | 1.1 km || 
|-id=693 bgcolor=#E9E9E9
| 465693 ||  || — || October 25, 2005 || Kitt Peak || Spacewatch || — || align=right | 1.1 km || 
|-id=694 bgcolor=#E9E9E9
| 465694 ||  || — || September 25, 2009 || Kitt Peak || Spacewatch || — || align=right | 2.0 km || 
|-id=695 bgcolor=#E9E9E9
| 465695 ||  || — || September 25, 2009 || Catalina || CSS || — || align=right | 1.5 km || 
|-id=696 bgcolor=#E9E9E9
| 465696 ||  || — || September 16, 2009 || Catalina || CSS || EUN || align=right | 1.2 km || 
|-id=697 bgcolor=#E9E9E9
| 465697 ||  || — || September 19, 2009 || Catalina || CSS || — || align=right | 2.4 km || 
|-id=698 bgcolor=#E9E9E9
| 465698 ||  || — || September 16, 2009 || Kitt Peak || Spacewatch || — || align=right | 1.5 km || 
|-id=699 bgcolor=#FA8072
| 465699 ||  || — || September 29, 2009 || Mount Lemmon || Mount Lemmon Survey || H || align=right data-sort-value="0.74" | 740 m || 
|-id=700 bgcolor=#E9E9E9
| 465700 ||  || — || September 21, 2009 || Mount Lemmon || Mount Lemmon Survey || — || align=right | 1.7 km || 
|}

465701–465800 

|-bgcolor=#E9E9E9
| 465701 ||  || — || September 19, 2009 || Mount Lemmon || Mount Lemmon Survey || — || align=right | 2.7 km || 
|-id=702 bgcolor=#E9E9E9
| 465702 ||  || — || October 13, 2009 || La Sagra || OAM Obs. || — || align=right | 2.8 km || 
|-id=703 bgcolor=#E9E9E9
| 465703 ||  || — || October 14, 2009 || Mount Lemmon || Mount Lemmon Survey || BRG || align=right | 1.2 km || 
|-id=704 bgcolor=#E9E9E9
| 465704 ||  || — || September 27, 2009 || Catalina || CSS || — || align=right | 2.2 km || 
|-id=705 bgcolor=#E9E9E9
| 465705 ||  || — || October 14, 2009 || La Sagra || OAM Obs. || — || align=right | 1.3 km || 
|-id=706 bgcolor=#fefefe
| 465706 ||  || — || October 14, 2009 || Catalina || CSS || H || align=right data-sort-value="0.81" | 810 m || 
|-id=707 bgcolor=#E9E9E9
| 465707 ||  || — || October 15, 2009 || Catalina || CSS || — || align=right | 2.4 km || 
|-id=708 bgcolor=#E9E9E9
| 465708 ||  || — || October 18, 2009 || Catalina || CSS || — || align=right | 2.2 km || 
|-id=709 bgcolor=#E9E9E9
| 465709 ||  || — || September 25, 2009 || Kitt Peak || Spacewatch || AGN || align=right data-sort-value="0.99" | 990 m || 
|-id=710 bgcolor=#d6d6d6
| 465710 ||  || — || October 22, 2009 || Auberry || Sierra Remote Obs. || — || align=right | 3.1 km || 
|-id=711 bgcolor=#d6d6d6
| 465711 ||  || — || September 21, 2009 || Mount Lemmon || Mount Lemmon Survey || — || align=right | 2.7 km || 
|-id=712 bgcolor=#E9E9E9
| 465712 ||  || — || October 22, 2009 || Mount Lemmon || Mount Lemmon Survey || — || align=right | 1.3 km || 
|-id=713 bgcolor=#E9E9E9
| 465713 ||  || — || October 17, 2009 || Mount Lemmon || Mount Lemmon Survey || — || align=right | 2.0 km || 
|-id=714 bgcolor=#E9E9E9
| 465714 ||  || — || October 17, 2009 || Mount Lemmon || Mount Lemmon Survey || — || align=right | 1.8 km || 
|-id=715 bgcolor=#E9E9E9
| 465715 ||  || — || May 19, 2004 || Campo Imperatore || CINEOS || — || align=right data-sort-value="0.84" | 840 m || 
|-id=716 bgcolor=#E9E9E9
| 465716 ||  || — || September 28, 2009 || Mount Lemmon || Mount Lemmon Survey || — || align=right | 1.9 km || 
|-id=717 bgcolor=#E9E9E9
| 465717 ||  || — || October 23, 2009 || Mount Lemmon || Mount Lemmon Survey || — || align=right | 2.1 km || 
|-id=718 bgcolor=#E9E9E9
| 465718 ||  || — || October 23, 2009 || Mount Lemmon || Mount Lemmon Survey || — || align=right | 1.2 km || 
|-id=719 bgcolor=#E9E9E9
| 465719 ||  || — || September 19, 2009 || Mount Lemmon || Mount Lemmon Survey || — || align=right | 1.6 km || 
|-id=720 bgcolor=#E9E9E9
| 465720 ||  || — || September 19, 2009 || Catalina || CSS || — || align=right | 2.5 km || 
|-id=721 bgcolor=#E9E9E9
| 465721 ||  || — || September 21, 2009 || Mount Lemmon || Mount Lemmon Survey || — || align=right | 1.6 km || 
|-id=722 bgcolor=#d6d6d6
| 465722 ||  || — || October 25, 2009 || Kitt Peak || Spacewatch || — || align=right | 3.0 km || 
|-id=723 bgcolor=#E9E9E9
| 465723 ||  || — || September 20, 2009 || Kitt Peak || Spacewatch || — || align=right | 1.8 km || 
|-id=724 bgcolor=#E9E9E9
| 465724 ||  || — || October 24, 2009 || Kitt Peak || Spacewatch ||  || align=right | 2.1 km || 
|-id=725 bgcolor=#E9E9E9
| 465725 ||  || — || October 16, 2009 || Catalina || CSS || — || align=right | 3.0 km || 
|-id=726 bgcolor=#E9E9E9
| 465726 ||  || — || October 18, 2009 || Catalina || CSS || MRX || align=right | 1.2 km || 
|-id=727 bgcolor=#E9E9E9
| 465727 ||  || — || October 23, 2009 || Kitt Peak || Spacewatch || — || align=right | 2.2 km || 
|-id=728 bgcolor=#E9E9E9
| 465728 ||  || — || October 22, 2009 || Mount Lemmon || Mount Lemmon Survey || AGN || align=right | 1.0 km || 
|-id=729 bgcolor=#E9E9E9
| 465729 ||  || — || December 25, 2005 || Kitt Peak || Spacewatch || HOF || align=right | 2.1 km || 
|-id=730 bgcolor=#E9E9E9
| 465730 ||  || — || October 18, 2009 || Mount Lemmon || Mount Lemmon Survey || — || align=right | 1.5 km || 
|-id=731 bgcolor=#E9E9E9
| 465731 ||  || — || November 8, 2009 || Mount Lemmon || Mount Lemmon Survey || HOF || align=right | 2.2 km || 
|-id=732 bgcolor=#E9E9E9
| 465732 ||  || — || March 15, 2007 || Kitt Peak || Spacewatch || — || align=right | 2.2 km || 
|-id=733 bgcolor=#E9E9E9
| 465733 ||  || — || October 27, 2009 || Kitt Peak || Spacewatch || — || align=right | 2.2 km || 
|-id=734 bgcolor=#E9E9E9
| 465734 ||  || — || October 24, 2009 || Kitt Peak || Spacewatch || — || align=right | 2.7 km || 
|-id=735 bgcolor=#E9E9E9
| 465735 ||  || — || November 9, 2009 || Kitt Peak || Spacewatch || HOF || align=right | 2.1 km || 
|-id=736 bgcolor=#d6d6d6
| 465736 ||  || — || November 9, 2009 || Mount Lemmon || Mount Lemmon Survey || — || align=right | 2.2 km || 
|-id=737 bgcolor=#E9E9E9
| 465737 ||  || — || September 22, 2009 || Mount Lemmon || Mount Lemmon Survey || MRX || align=right | 1.2 km || 
|-id=738 bgcolor=#E9E9E9
| 465738 ||  || — || October 25, 2009 || Kitt Peak || Spacewatch || — || align=right | 1.3 km || 
|-id=739 bgcolor=#fefefe
| 465739 ||  || — || October 26, 2009 || Kitt Peak || Spacewatch || H || align=right data-sort-value="0.75" | 750 m || 
|-id=740 bgcolor=#E9E9E9
| 465740 ||  || — || November 8, 2009 || Kitt Peak || Spacewatch || — || align=right | 1.8 km || 
|-id=741 bgcolor=#fefefe
| 465741 ||  || — || October 19, 2009 || Socorro || LINEAR || H || align=right data-sort-value="0.59" | 590 m || 
|-id=742 bgcolor=#E9E9E9
| 465742 ||  || — || November 9, 2009 || Catalina || CSS || — || align=right | 3.4 km || 
|-id=743 bgcolor=#d6d6d6
| 465743 ||  || — || December 18, 2004 || Mount Lemmon || Mount Lemmon Survey || — || align=right | 2.5 km || 
|-id=744 bgcolor=#E9E9E9
| 465744 ||  || — || November 10, 2009 || Kitt Peak || Spacewatch || AGN || align=right data-sort-value="0.96" | 960 m || 
|-id=745 bgcolor=#E9E9E9
| 465745 ||  || — || September 20, 2009 || Mount Lemmon || Mount Lemmon Survey || — || align=right | 2.0 km || 
|-id=746 bgcolor=#d6d6d6
| 465746 ||  || — || November 9, 2009 || Kitt Peak || Spacewatch || critical || align=right | 2.0 km || 
|-id=747 bgcolor=#E9E9E9
| 465747 ||  || — || October 25, 2009 || Catalina || CSS ||  || align=right | 2.7 km || 
|-id=748 bgcolor=#E9E9E9
| 465748 ||  || — || November 9, 2009 || Mount Lemmon || Mount Lemmon Survey || — || align=right | 2.3 km || 
|-id=749 bgcolor=#FFC2E0
| 465749 ||  || — || October 18, 2009 || Siding Spring || SSS || AMO +1km || align=right | 2.5 km || 
|-id=750 bgcolor=#d6d6d6
| 465750 ||  || — || June 9, 2007 || Kitt Peak || Spacewatch || — || align=right | 2.7 km || 
|-id=751 bgcolor=#E9E9E9
| 465751 ||  || — || November 16, 2009 || Kitt Peak || Spacewatch || DOR || align=right | 2.9 km || 
|-id=752 bgcolor=#E9E9E9
| 465752 ||  || — || November 16, 2009 || Kitt Peak || Spacewatch || — || align=right | 2.0 km || 
|-id=753 bgcolor=#E9E9E9
| 465753 ||  || — || October 25, 2009 || Kitt Peak || Spacewatch || EUN || align=right | 1.2 km || 
|-id=754 bgcolor=#E9E9E9
| 465754 ||  || — || November 9, 2009 || Mount Lemmon || Mount Lemmon Survey || — || align=right | 2.2 km || 
|-id=755 bgcolor=#E9E9E9
| 465755 ||  || — || November 19, 2009 || La Sagra || OAM Obs. || — || align=right | 3.3 km || 
|-id=756 bgcolor=#E9E9E9
| 465756 ||  || — || November 17, 2009 || Mount Lemmon || Mount Lemmon Survey || HOF || align=right | 2.7 km || 
|-id=757 bgcolor=#E9E9E9
| 465757 ||  || — || November 9, 2009 || Kitt Peak || Spacewatch || — || align=right | 1.5 km || 
|-id=758 bgcolor=#E9E9E9
| 465758 ||  || — || November 18, 2009 || Kitt Peak || Spacewatch || — || align=right | 1.4 km || 
|-id=759 bgcolor=#E9E9E9
| 465759 ||  || — || November 19, 2009 || Kitt Peak || Spacewatch || — || align=right | 1.9 km || 
|-id=760 bgcolor=#fefefe
| 465760 ||  || — || November 23, 2009 || La Sagra || OAM Obs. || H || align=right data-sort-value="0.83" | 830 m || 
|-id=761 bgcolor=#E9E9E9
| 465761 ||  || — || September 23, 2004 || Kitt Peak || Spacewatch || AGN || align=right data-sort-value="0.99" | 990 m || 
|-id=762 bgcolor=#E9E9E9
| 465762 ||  || — || November 20, 2009 || Kitt Peak || Spacewatch || — || align=right | 3.1 km || 
|-id=763 bgcolor=#d6d6d6
| 465763 ||  || — || October 23, 2009 || Kitt Peak || Spacewatch || — || align=right | 1.9 km || 
|-id=764 bgcolor=#d6d6d6
| 465764 ||  || — || November 19, 2009 || Mount Lemmon || Mount Lemmon Survey || — || align=right | 1.9 km || 
|-id=765 bgcolor=#E9E9E9
| 465765 ||  || — || June 6, 2008 || Kitt Peak || Spacewatch || GEF || align=right | 1.1 km || 
|-id=766 bgcolor=#E9E9E9
| 465766 ||  || — || November 10, 2009 || Kitt Peak || Spacewatch || — || align=right | 1.2 km || 
|-id=767 bgcolor=#E9E9E9
| 465767 ||  || — || October 18, 2009 || Mount Lemmon || Mount Lemmon Survey || — || align=right | 1.4 km || 
|-id=768 bgcolor=#E9E9E9
| 465768 ||  || — || November 24, 2009 || Mount Lemmon || Mount Lemmon Survey || HOF || align=right | 2.8 km || 
|-id=769 bgcolor=#E9E9E9
| 465769 ||  || — || October 16, 2009 || Mount Lemmon || Mount Lemmon Survey || — || align=right | 2.3 km || 
|-id=770 bgcolor=#E9E9E9
| 465770 ||  || — || November 18, 2009 || Kitt Peak || Spacewatch || — || align=right | 1.8 km || 
|-id=771 bgcolor=#E9E9E9
| 465771 ||  || — || November 10, 2009 || Kitt Peak || Spacewatch || — || align=right | 1.8 km || 
|-id=772 bgcolor=#d6d6d6
| 465772 ||  || — || September 22, 2009 || Mount Lemmon || Mount Lemmon Survey || — || align=right | 1.8 km || 
|-id=773 bgcolor=#E9E9E9
| 465773 ||  || — || October 23, 2009 || Mount Lemmon || Mount Lemmon Survey || MRX || align=right | 1.1 km || 
|-id=774 bgcolor=#E9E9E9
| 465774 ||  || — || November 17, 2009 || Kitt Peak || Spacewatch || — || align=right | 2.6 km || 
|-id=775 bgcolor=#E9E9E9
| 465775 ||  || — || October 23, 2009 || Kitt Peak || Spacewatch || — || align=right | 2.3 km || 
|-id=776 bgcolor=#E9E9E9
| 465776 ||  || — || November 25, 2009 || Kitt Peak || Spacewatch || — || align=right | 2.2 km || 
|-id=777 bgcolor=#E9E9E9
| 465777 ||  || — || November 20, 2009 || Kitt Peak || Spacewatch || — || align=right | 2.0 km || 
|-id=778 bgcolor=#d6d6d6
| 465778 ||  || — || November 9, 2009 || Kitt Peak || Spacewatch || EOS || align=right | 2.0 km || 
|-id=779 bgcolor=#d6d6d6
| 465779 ||  || — || November 25, 2009 || Mount Lemmon || Mount Lemmon Survey || — || align=right | 2.5 km || 
|-id=780 bgcolor=#d6d6d6
| 465780 ||  || — || January 6, 2010 || Kitt Peak || Spacewatch || — || align=right | 2.9 km || 
|-id=781 bgcolor=#d6d6d6
| 465781 ||  || — || January 6, 2010 || Kitt Peak || Spacewatch || — || align=right | 2.6 km || 
|-id=782 bgcolor=#d6d6d6
| 465782 ||  || — || January 7, 2010 || Kitt Peak || Spacewatch || EOS || align=right | 2.0 km || 
|-id=783 bgcolor=#d6d6d6
| 465783 ||  || — || January 7, 2010 || Kitt Peak || Spacewatch || — || align=right | 3.4 km || 
|-id=784 bgcolor=#d6d6d6
| 465784 ||  || — || January 7, 2010 || Kitt Peak || Spacewatch || — || align=right | 3.6 km || 
|-id=785 bgcolor=#d6d6d6
| 465785 ||  || — || January 8, 2010 || Kitt Peak || Spacewatch || — || align=right | 3.6 km || 
|-id=786 bgcolor=#d6d6d6
| 465786 ||  || — || January 11, 2010 || Tzec Maun || D. Chestnov, A. Novichonok || — || align=right | 2.2 km || 
|-id=787 bgcolor=#d6d6d6
| 465787 ||  || — || January 12, 2010 || WISE || WISE || — || align=right | 3.9 km || 
|-id=788 bgcolor=#d6d6d6
| 465788 ||  || — || January 14, 2010 || WISE || WISE || Tj (2.98) || align=right | 4.0 km || 
|-id=789 bgcolor=#d6d6d6
| 465789 ||  || — || January 7, 2010 || Kitt Peak || Spacewatch || — || align=right | 2.2 km || 
|-id=790 bgcolor=#d6d6d6
| 465790 ||  || — || January 16, 2010 || WISE || WISE || — || align=right | 4.2 km || 
|-id=791 bgcolor=#d6d6d6
| 465791 ||  || — || January 18, 2010 || WISE || WISE || — || align=right | 3.4 km || 
|-id=792 bgcolor=#d6d6d6
| 465792 ||  || — || January 19, 2010 || WISE || WISE || — || align=right | 4.3 km || 
|-id=793 bgcolor=#d6d6d6
| 465793 ||  || — || January 22, 2010 || WISE || WISE || — || align=right | 4.4 km || 
|-id=794 bgcolor=#d6d6d6
| 465794 ||  || — || February 5, 2010 || Kitt Peak || Spacewatch || THM || align=right | 1.9 km || 
|-id=795 bgcolor=#d6d6d6
| 465795 ||  || — || February 10, 2010 || Kitt Peak || Spacewatch || EOS || align=right | 1.8 km || 
|-id=796 bgcolor=#d6d6d6
| 465796 ||  || — || February 10, 2010 || Kitt Peak || Spacewatch || — || align=right | 3.1 km || 
|-id=797 bgcolor=#d6d6d6
| 465797 ||  || — || February 14, 2010 || Calvin-Rehoboth || Calvin–Rehoboth Obs. || — || align=right | 3.9 km || 
|-id=798 bgcolor=#d6d6d6
| 465798 ||  || — || February 9, 2010 || Kitt Peak || Spacewatch || — || align=right | 2.4 km || 
|-id=799 bgcolor=#d6d6d6
| 465799 ||  || — || February 13, 2010 || Socorro || LINEAR || LIX || align=right | 2.8 km || 
|-id=800 bgcolor=#d6d6d6
| 465800 ||  || — || February 13, 2010 || Mount Lemmon || Mount Lemmon Survey || — || align=right | 3.4 km || 
|}

465801–465900 

|-bgcolor=#d6d6d6
| 465801 ||  || — || November 20, 2008 || Kitt Peak || Spacewatch || — || align=right | 2.9 km || 
|-id=802 bgcolor=#d6d6d6
| 465802 ||  || — || November 27, 2009 || Mount Lemmon || Mount Lemmon Survey || EOS || align=right | 2.1 km || 
|-id=803 bgcolor=#d6d6d6
| 465803 ||  || — || November 27, 2009 || Mount Lemmon || Mount Lemmon Survey || — || align=right | 3.7 km || 
|-id=804 bgcolor=#d6d6d6
| 465804 ||  || — || February 9, 2010 || Kitt Peak || Spacewatch || — || align=right | 3.0 km || 
|-id=805 bgcolor=#d6d6d6
| 465805 ||  || — || February 15, 2010 || Catalina || CSS || — || align=right | 2.6 km || 
|-id=806 bgcolor=#d6d6d6
| 465806 ||  || — || January 12, 2010 || Kitt Peak || Spacewatch || — || align=right | 2.6 km || 
|-id=807 bgcolor=#d6d6d6
| 465807 ||  || — || February 14, 2010 || Catalina || CSS || — || align=right | 3.3 km || 
|-id=808 bgcolor=#d6d6d6
| 465808 ||  || — || February 13, 2010 || Mount Lemmon || Mount Lemmon Survey || THM || align=right | 1.9 km || 
|-id=809 bgcolor=#d6d6d6
| 465809 ||  || — || October 27, 2008 || Kitt Peak || Spacewatch || — || align=right | 3.3 km || 
|-id=810 bgcolor=#d6d6d6
| 465810 ||  || — || December 22, 2003 || Kitt Peak || Spacewatch || — || align=right | 3.3 km || 
|-id=811 bgcolor=#d6d6d6
| 465811 ||  || — || January 6, 2010 || Kitt Peak || Spacewatch || EOS || align=right | 1.9 km || 
|-id=812 bgcolor=#d6d6d6
| 465812 ||  || — || October 22, 2008 || Kitt Peak || Spacewatch || — || align=right | 2.4 km || 
|-id=813 bgcolor=#d6d6d6
| 465813 ||  || — || December 2, 2008 || Mount Lemmon || Mount Lemmon Survey || HYG || align=right | 2.2 km || 
|-id=814 bgcolor=#d6d6d6
| 465814 ||  || — || February 17, 2010 || Kitt Peak || Spacewatch || — || align=right | 2.1 km || 
|-id=815 bgcolor=#d6d6d6
| 465815 ||  || — || March 4, 2010 || Kitt Peak || Spacewatch || — || align=right | 2.6 km || 
|-id=816 bgcolor=#d6d6d6
| 465816 ||  || — || January 8, 2010 || Mount Lemmon || Mount Lemmon Survey || — || align=right | 3.7 km || 
|-id=817 bgcolor=#d6d6d6
| 465817 ||  || — || March 4, 2010 || Kitt Peak || Spacewatch || — || align=right | 2.9 km || 
|-id=818 bgcolor=#d6d6d6
| 465818 ||  || — || February 19, 2010 || Mount Lemmon || Mount Lemmon Survey || — || align=right | 2.5 km || 
|-id=819 bgcolor=#d6d6d6
| 465819 ||  || — || March 13, 2010 || Mount Lemmon || Mount Lemmon Survey || — || align=right | 4.3 km || 
|-id=820 bgcolor=#d6d6d6
| 465820 ||  || — || March 12, 2010 || Catalina || CSS || — || align=right | 4.1 km || 
|-id=821 bgcolor=#d6d6d6
| 465821 ||  || — || March 15, 2010 || Kitt Peak || Spacewatch || THB || align=right | 3.6 km || 
|-id=822 bgcolor=#d6d6d6
| 465822 ||  || — || March 12, 2010 || Mount Lemmon || Mount Lemmon Survey || — || align=right | 3.1 km || 
|-id=823 bgcolor=#d6d6d6
| 465823 ||  || — || March 12, 2010 || Kitt Peak || Spacewatch || — || align=right | 2.6 km || 
|-id=824 bgcolor=#FFC2E0
| 465824 ||  || — || March 18, 2010 || Catalina || CSS || APOPHA || align=right data-sort-value="0.16" | 160 m || 
|-id=825 bgcolor=#d6d6d6
| 465825 ||  || — || March 16, 2010 || Mount Lemmon || Mount Lemmon Survey || — || align=right | 2.8 km || 
|-id=826 bgcolor=#FFC2E0
| 465826 ||  || — || April 4, 2010 || Catalina || CSS || APOcritical || align=right data-sort-value="0.15" | 150 m || 
|-id=827 bgcolor=#d6d6d6
| 465827 ||  || — || January 23, 2010 || WISE || WISE || — || align=right | 4.2 km || 
|-id=828 bgcolor=#d6d6d6
| 465828 ||  || — || April 4, 2010 || Kitt Peak || Spacewatch || — || align=right | 3.4 km || 
|-id=829 bgcolor=#d6d6d6
| 465829 ||  || — || October 22, 2008 || Kitt Peak || Spacewatch || — || align=right | 2.6 km || 
|-id=830 bgcolor=#d6d6d6
| 465830 ||  || — || May 15, 2005 || Mount Lemmon || Mount Lemmon Survey || — || align=right | 5.2 km || 
|-id=831 bgcolor=#fefefe
| 465831 ||  || — || May 2, 2010 || WISE || WISE || — || align=right | 1.6 km || 
|-id=832 bgcolor=#d6d6d6
| 465832 ||  || — || January 13, 2010 || WISE || WISE || — || align=right | 3.7 km || 
|-id=833 bgcolor=#d6d6d6
| 465833 ||  || — || May 8, 2010 || Mount Lemmon || Mount Lemmon Survey || 7:4 || align=right | 4.1 km || 
|-id=834 bgcolor=#d6d6d6
| 465834 ||  || — || June 6, 2010 || WISE || WISE || — || align=right | 5.1 km || 
|-id=835 bgcolor=#fefefe
| 465835 ||  || — || June 9, 2010 || WISE || WISE || — || align=right | 1.5 km || 
|-id=836 bgcolor=#fefefe
| 465836 ||  || — || April 24, 2006 || Kitt Peak || Spacewatch || — || align=right | 1.1 km || 
|-id=837 bgcolor=#fefefe
| 465837 ||  || — || June 22, 2010 || WISE || WISE || — || align=right | 1.8 km || 
|-id=838 bgcolor=#fefefe
| 465838 ||  || — || June 23, 2010 || WISE || WISE || — || align=right | 1.3 km || 
|-id=839 bgcolor=#fefefe
| 465839 ||  || — || October 1, 2003 || Kitt Peak || Spacewatch || — || align=right | 1.5 km || 
|-id=840 bgcolor=#fefefe
| 465840 ||  || — || March 29, 2009 || Kitt Peak || Spacewatch || — || align=right | 1.4 km || 
|-id=841 bgcolor=#fefefe
| 465841 ||  || — || January 14, 2008 || Kitt Peak || Spacewatch || — || align=right | 1.6 km || 
|-id=842 bgcolor=#d6d6d6
| 465842 ||  || — || September 25, 2006 || Kitt Peak || Spacewatch || — || align=right | 3.2 km || 
|-id=843 bgcolor=#fefefe
| 465843 ||  || — || July 19, 2010 || WISE || WISE || — || align=right | 1.7 km || 
|-id=844 bgcolor=#fefefe
| 465844 ||  || — || July 21, 2010 || WISE || WISE || — || align=right | 1.2 km || 
|-id=845 bgcolor=#fefefe
| 465845 ||  || — || July 26, 2010 || WISE || WISE || ERI || align=right | 1.6 km || 
|-id=846 bgcolor=#E9E9E9
| 465846 ||  || — || October 27, 2006 || Catalina || CSS || — || align=right | 2.3 km || 
|-id=847 bgcolor=#E9E9E9
| 465847 ||  || — || August 6, 2010 || WISE || WISE || KON || align=right | 2.4 km || 
|-id=848 bgcolor=#E9E9E9
| 465848 ||  || — || August 8, 2010 || WISE || WISE || (5) || align=right | 1.6 km || 
|-id=849 bgcolor=#fefefe
| 465849 ||  || — || October 15, 2007 || Mount Lemmon || Mount Lemmon Survey || — || align=right data-sort-value="0.68" | 680 m || 
|-id=850 bgcolor=#fefefe
| 465850 ||  || — || August 10, 2010 || Kitt Peak || Spacewatch || — || align=right data-sort-value="0.75" | 750 m || 
|-id=851 bgcolor=#fefefe
| 465851 ||  || — || August 10, 2010 || Kitt Peak || Spacewatch || — || align=right data-sort-value="0.61" | 610 m || 
|-id=852 bgcolor=#fefefe
| 465852 ||  || — || September 2, 2010 || Socorro || LINEAR || — || align=right data-sort-value="0.80" | 800 m || 
|-id=853 bgcolor=#FFC2E0
| 465853 ||  || — || September 5, 2010 || Mount Lemmon || Mount Lemmon Survey || AMOcritical || align=right data-sort-value="0.45" | 450 m || 
|-id=854 bgcolor=#fefefe
| 465854 ||  || — || February 1, 2008 || Mount Lemmon || Mount Lemmon Survey || NYS || align=right data-sort-value="0.70" | 700 m || 
|-id=855 bgcolor=#fefefe
| 465855 ||  || — || August 13, 2010 || Kitt Peak || Spacewatch || — || align=right data-sort-value="0.62" | 620 m || 
|-id=856 bgcolor=#fefefe
| 465856 ||  || — || January 13, 2008 || Kitt Peak || Spacewatch || — || align=right data-sort-value="0.83" | 830 m || 
|-id=857 bgcolor=#fefefe
| 465857 ||  || — || September 7, 2010 || La Sagra || OAM Obs. || NYS || align=right data-sort-value="0.74" | 740 m || 
|-id=858 bgcolor=#fefefe
| 465858 ||  || — || September 10, 2010 || Kitt Peak || Spacewatch || — || align=right data-sort-value="0.68" | 680 m || 
|-id=859 bgcolor=#fefefe
| 465859 ||  || — || September 10, 2010 || Kitt Peak || Spacewatch || — || align=right data-sort-value="0.80" | 800 m || 
|-id=860 bgcolor=#fefefe
| 465860 ||  || — || September 10, 2010 || Kitt Peak || Spacewatch || V || align=right data-sort-value="0.51" | 510 m || 
|-id=861 bgcolor=#fefefe
| 465861 ||  || — || September 11, 2010 || Kitt Peak || Spacewatch || — || align=right data-sort-value="0.80" | 800 m || 
|-id=862 bgcolor=#E9E9E9
| 465862 ||  || — || September 11, 2010 || Kitt Peak || Spacewatch || (1547) || align=right | 1.3 km || 
|-id=863 bgcolor=#fefefe
| 465863 ||  || — || March 23, 2006 || Kitt Peak || Spacewatch || — || align=right data-sort-value="0.75" | 750 m || 
|-id=864 bgcolor=#fefefe
| 465864 ||  || — || September 9, 2010 || Kitt Peak || Spacewatch || — || align=right data-sort-value="0.87" | 870 m || 
|-id=865 bgcolor=#fefefe
| 465865 ||  || — || March 2, 2009 || Kitt Peak || Spacewatch || — || align=right data-sort-value="0.76" | 760 m || 
|-id=866 bgcolor=#fefefe
| 465866 ||  || — || March 16, 2009 || Mount Lemmon || Mount Lemmon Survey || — || align=right data-sort-value="0.68" | 680 m || 
|-id=867 bgcolor=#fefefe
| 465867 ||  || — || September 28, 2003 || Kitt Peak || Spacewatch || — || align=right data-sort-value="0.69" | 690 m || 
|-id=868 bgcolor=#fefefe
| 465868 ||  || — || September 10, 2010 || Kitt Peak || Spacewatch || — || align=right data-sort-value="0.83" | 830 m || 
|-id=869 bgcolor=#fefefe
| 465869 ||  || — || June 23, 2010 || Mount Lemmon || Mount Lemmon Survey || — || align=right data-sort-value="0.80" | 800 m || 
|-id=870 bgcolor=#fefefe
| 465870 ||  || — || May 5, 2006 || Kitt Peak || Spacewatch || — || align=right data-sort-value="0.65" | 650 m || 
|-id=871 bgcolor=#fefefe
| 465871 ||  || — || September 11, 2010 || Kitt Peak || Spacewatch || — || align=right data-sort-value="0.68" | 680 m || 
|-id=872 bgcolor=#fefefe
| 465872 ||  || — || October 3, 2010 || Kitt Peak || Spacewatch || — || align=right data-sort-value="0.81" | 810 m || 
|-id=873 bgcolor=#fefefe
| 465873 ||  || — || September 17, 2010 || Kitt Peak || Spacewatch || — || align=right data-sort-value="0.68" | 680 m || 
|-id=874 bgcolor=#fefefe
| 465874 ||  || — || October 25, 2003 || Kitt Peak || Spacewatch || — || align=right data-sort-value="0.67" | 670 m || 
|-id=875 bgcolor=#fefefe
| 465875 ||  || — || March 10, 2005 || Mount Lemmon || Mount Lemmon Survey || V || align=right data-sort-value="0.57" | 570 m || 
|-id=876 bgcolor=#fefefe
| 465876 ||  || — || October 1, 2010 || Kitt Peak || Spacewatch || — || align=right data-sort-value="0.75" | 750 m || 
|-id=877 bgcolor=#fefefe
| 465877 ||  || — || September 2, 2010 || Mount Lemmon || Mount Lemmon Survey || V || align=right data-sort-value="0.53" | 530 m || 
|-id=878 bgcolor=#fefefe
| 465878 ||  || — || January 11, 2008 || Mount Lemmon || Mount Lemmon Survey || — || align=right data-sort-value="0.65" | 650 m || 
|-id=879 bgcolor=#fefefe
| 465879 ||  || — || August 12, 2010 || Kitt Peak || Spacewatch || — || align=right data-sort-value="0.78" | 780 m || 
|-id=880 bgcolor=#fefefe
| 465880 ||  || — || October 1, 2010 || Mount Lemmon || Mount Lemmon Survey || — || align=right data-sort-value="0.49" | 490 m || 
|-id=881 bgcolor=#fefefe
| 465881 ||  || — || November 14, 2007 || Kitt Peak || Spacewatch || — || align=right data-sort-value="0.83" | 830 m || 
|-id=882 bgcolor=#fefefe
| 465882 ||  || — || January 18, 2008 || Kitt Peak || Spacewatch || V || align=right data-sort-value="0.59" | 590 m || 
|-id=883 bgcolor=#E9E9E9
| 465883 ||  || — || October 1, 2010 || Catalina || CSS || — || align=right | 1.7 km || 
|-id=884 bgcolor=#fefefe
| 465884 ||  || — || May 2, 2006 || Mount Lemmon || Mount Lemmon Survey || — || align=right data-sort-value="0.69" | 690 m || 
|-id=885 bgcolor=#fefefe
| 465885 ||  || — || September 18, 2010 || Mount Lemmon || Mount Lemmon Survey || — || align=right data-sort-value="0.65" | 650 m || 
|-id=886 bgcolor=#fefefe
| 465886 ||  || — || October 2, 2010 || Mount Lemmon || Mount Lemmon Survey || — || align=right data-sort-value="0.83" | 830 m || 
|-id=887 bgcolor=#E9E9E9
| 465887 ||  || — || October 13, 2010 || Catalina || CSS || — || align=right data-sort-value="0.99" | 990 m || 
|-id=888 bgcolor=#fefefe
| 465888 ||  || — || October 8, 2010 || Catalina || CSS || MAS || align=right data-sort-value="0.70" | 700 m || 
|-id=889 bgcolor=#E9E9E9
| 465889 ||  || — || July 23, 2010 || WISE || WISE || — || align=right | 2.1 km || 
|-id=890 bgcolor=#fefefe
| 465890 ||  || — || September 28, 2006 || Kitt Peak || Spacewatch || — || align=right data-sort-value="0.83" | 830 m || 
|-id=891 bgcolor=#fefefe
| 465891 ||  || — || August 29, 2006 || Kitt Peak || Spacewatch || V || align=right data-sort-value="0.53" | 530 m || 
|-id=892 bgcolor=#FFC2E0
| 465892 ||  || — || October 29, 2010 || Mount Lemmon || Mount Lemmon Survey || APOPHA || align=right data-sort-value="0.42" | 420 m || 
|-id=893 bgcolor=#fefefe
| 465893 ||  || — || December 14, 2003 || Kitt Peak || Spacewatch || — || align=right data-sort-value="0.71" | 710 m || 
|-id=894 bgcolor=#fefefe
| 465894 ||  || — || November 10, 1996 || Kitt Peak || Spacewatch || — || align=right data-sort-value="0.74" | 740 m || 
|-id=895 bgcolor=#E9E9E9
| 465895 ||  || — || November 3, 2006 || Mount Lemmon || Mount Lemmon Survey || — || align=right data-sort-value="0.91" | 910 m || 
|-id=896 bgcolor=#E9E9E9
| 465896 ||  || — || December 13, 2006 || Kitt Peak || Spacewatch || (5) || align=right data-sort-value="0.71" | 710 m || 
|-id=897 bgcolor=#E9E9E9
| 465897 ||  || — || December 16, 1993 || Kitt Peak || Spacewatch || — || align=right | 1.6 km || 
|-id=898 bgcolor=#E9E9E9
| 465898 ||  || — || October 14, 2010 || Mount Lemmon || Mount Lemmon Survey || — || align=right | 1.2 km || 
|-id=899 bgcolor=#E9E9E9
| 465899 ||  || — || September 11, 2010 || Mount Lemmon || Mount Lemmon Survey || — || align=right data-sort-value="0.85" | 850 m || 
|-id=900 bgcolor=#C2FFFF
| 465900 ||  || — || September 30, 2009 || Mount Lemmon || Mount Lemmon Survey || L4 || align=right | 9.7 km || 
|}

465901–466000 

|-bgcolor=#E9E9E9
| 465901 ||  || — || November 12, 2006 || Mount Lemmon || Mount Lemmon Survey || — || align=right | 1.0 km || 
|-id=902 bgcolor=#fefefe
| 465902 ||  || — || January 19, 2008 || Mount Lemmon || Mount Lemmon Survey || V || align=right data-sort-value="0.60" | 600 m || 
|-id=903 bgcolor=#fefefe
| 465903 ||  || — || November 19, 2003 || Kitt Peak || Spacewatch || — || align=right data-sort-value="0.80" | 800 m || 
|-id=904 bgcolor=#E9E9E9
| 465904 ||  || — || November 2, 2010 || Kitt Peak || Spacewatch || — || align=right | 1.3 km || 
|-id=905 bgcolor=#fefefe
| 465905 ||  || — || August 27, 2006 || Kitt Peak || Spacewatch || MAS || align=right data-sort-value="0.74" | 740 m || 
|-id=906 bgcolor=#E9E9E9
| 465906 ||  || — || December 12, 2006 || Kitt Peak || Spacewatch || — || align=right data-sort-value="0.75" | 750 m || 
|-id=907 bgcolor=#E9E9E9
| 465907 ||  || — || November 3, 2010 || Kitt Peak || Spacewatch || — || align=right | 1.3 km || 
|-id=908 bgcolor=#fefefe
| 465908 ||  || — || October 19, 1995 || Kitt Peak || Spacewatch || — || align=right data-sort-value="0.65" | 650 m || 
|-id=909 bgcolor=#C2FFFF
| 465909 ||  || — || October 28, 2010 || Mount Lemmon || Mount Lemmon Survey || L4 || align=right | 8.9 km || 
|-id=910 bgcolor=#fefefe
| 465910 ||  || — || September 3, 2010 || Mount Lemmon || Mount Lemmon Survey || — || align=right data-sort-value="0.92" | 920 m || 
|-id=911 bgcolor=#E9E9E9
| 465911 ||  || — || April 26, 2008 || Kitt Peak || Spacewatch || — || align=right | 1.7 km || 
|-id=912 bgcolor=#E9E9E9
| 465912 ||  || — || October 13, 2010 || Mount Lemmon || Mount Lemmon Survey || (5) || align=right data-sort-value="0.73" | 730 m || 
|-id=913 bgcolor=#E9E9E9
| 465913 ||  || — || November 8, 2010 || Kitt Peak || Spacewatch || — || align=right | 1.4 km || 
|-id=914 bgcolor=#FA8072
| 465914 ||  || — || October 21, 2006 || Mount Lemmon || Mount Lemmon Survey || — || align=right | 2.0 km || 
|-id=915 bgcolor=#E9E9E9
| 465915 ||  || — || November 17, 2006 || Kitt Peak || Spacewatch || — || align=right | 1.00 km || 
|-id=916 bgcolor=#E9E9E9
| 465916 ||  || — || November 17, 2006 || Mount Lemmon || Mount Lemmon Survey || — || align=right data-sort-value="0.81" | 810 m || 
|-id=917 bgcolor=#E9E9E9
| 465917 ||  || — || October 30, 2010 || Mount Lemmon || Mount Lemmon Survey || KON || align=right | 1.8 km || 
|-id=918 bgcolor=#E9E9E9
| 465918 ||  || — || September 11, 2010 || Mount Lemmon || Mount Lemmon Survey || — || align=right | 1.2 km || 
|-id=919 bgcolor=#E9E9E9
| 465919 ||  || — || November 16, 2006 || Kitt Peak || Spacewatch || — || align=right data-sort-value="0.82" | 820 m || 
|-id=920 bgcolor=#fefefe
| 465920 ||  || — || November 3, 2010 || Mount Lemmon || Mount Lemmon Survey || — || align=right | 1.1 km || 
|-id=921 bgcolor=#fefefe
| 465921 ||  || — || November 4, 2010 || Mount Lemmon || Mount Lemmon Survey || — || align=right data-sort-value="0.83" | 830 m || 
|-id=922 bgcolor=#fefefe
| 465922 ||  || — || September 30, 1995 || Kitt Peak || Spacewatch || V || align=right data-sort-value="0.59" | 590 m || 
|-id=923 bgcolor=#fefefe
| 465923 ||  || — || February 13, 2008 || Mount Lemmon || Mount Lemmon Survey || — || align=right data-sort-value="0.92" | 920 m || 
|-id=924 bgcolor=#E9E9E9
| 465924 ||  || — || November 12, 2010 || Mount Lemmon || Mount Lemmon Survey || KON || align=right | 2.1 km || 
|-id=925 bgcolor=#E9E9E9
| 465925 ||  || — || November 21, 2006 || Mount Lemmon || Mount Lemmon Survey || — || align=right | 1.5 km || 
|-id=926 bgcolor=#E9E9E9
| 465926 ||  || — || December 10, 2006 || Kitt Peak || Spacewatch || (5) || align=right data-sort-value="0.78" | 780 m || 
|-id=927 bgcolor=#E9E9E9
| 465927 ||  || — || December 13, 2006 || Kitt Peak || Spacewatch || — || align=right data-sort-value="0.89" | 890 m || 
|-id=928 bgcolor=#E9E9E9
| 465928 ||  || — || December 24, 2006 || Kitt Peak || Spacewatch || — || align=right | 1.2 km || 
|-id=929 bgcolor=#E9E9E9
| 465929 ||  || — || November 15, 2010 || Catalina || CSS || — || align=right | 1.00 km || 
|-id=930 bgcolor=#E9E9E9
| 465930 ||  || — || November 17, 2006 || Kitt Peak || Spacewatch || — || align=right | 1.2 km || 
|-id=931 bgcolor=#E9E9E9
| 465931 ||  || — || December 8, 2010 || Mount Lemmon || Mount Lemmon Survey || — || align=right | 1.2 km || 
|-id=932 bgcolor=#E9E9E9
| 465932 ||  || — || December 10, 2010 || Mount Lemmon || Mount Lemmon Survey || — || align=right | 2.7 km || 
|-id=933 bgcolor=#E9E9E9
| 465933 ||  || — || December 2, 2010 || Mount Lemmon || Mount Lemmon Survey || (5) || align=right data-sort-value="0.89" | 890 m || 
|-id=934 bgcolor=#E9E9E9
| 465934 ||  || — || November 25, 2006 || Mount Lemmon || Mount Lemmon Survey || — || align=right | 1.3 km || 
|-id=935 bgcolor=#E9E9E9
| 465935 ||  || — || November 6, 2010 || Mount Lemmon || Mount Lemmon Survey || EUN || align=right | 1.1 km || 
|-id=936 bgcolor=#E9E9E9
| 465936 ||  || — || December 13, 2010 || Mount Lemmon || Mount Lemmon Survey || — || align=right | 1.2 km || 
|-id=937 bgcolor=#E9E9E9
| 465937 ||  || — || January 10, 2007 || Mount Lemmon || Mount Lemmon Survey || — || align=right | 1.1 km || 
|-id=938 bgcolor=#E9E9E9
| 465938 ||  || — || January 14, 2002 || Socorro || LINEAR || — || align=right | 2.4 km || 
|-id=939 bgcolor=#E9E9E9
| 465939 ||  || — || November 15, 2010 || Mount Lemmon || Mount Lemmon Survey || — || align=right | 1.8 km || 
|-id=940 bgcolor=#E9E9E9
| 465940 ||  || — || January 9, 2011 || Kitt Peak || Spacewatch || — || align=right | 1.5 km || 
|-id=941 bgcolor=#E9E9E9
| 465941 ||  || — || March 10, 2007 || Mount Lemmon || Mount Lemmon Survey || — || align=right | 1.0 km || 
|-id=942 bgcolor=#E9E9E9
| 465942 ||  || — || February 21, 2007 || Mount Lemmon || Mount Lemmon Survey || — || align=right | 1.2 km || 
|-id=943 bgcolor=#E9E9E9
| 465943 ||  || — || January 27, 2007 || Mount Lemmon || Mount Lemmon Survey || (5) || align=right data-sort-value="0.73" | 730 m || 
|-id=944 bgcolor=#E9E9E9
| 465944 ||  || — || April 15, 2007 || Kitt Peak || Spacewatch || — || align=right | 1.6 km || 
|-id=945 bgcolor=#E9E9E9
| 465945 ||  || — || December 14, 2010 || Mount Lemmon || Mount Lemmon Survey || — || align=right | 1.8 km || 
|-id=946 bgcolor=#E9E9E9
| 465946 ||  || — || January 14, 2011 || Kitt Peak || Spacewatch || — || align=right | 1.4 km || 
|-id=947 bgcolor=#E9E9E9
| 465947 ||  || — || February 23, 2007 || Kitt Peak || Spacewatch || — || align=right | 1.1 km || 
|-id=948 bgcolor=#E9E9E9
| 465948 ||  || — || January 19, 2002 || Kitt Peak || Spacewatch || — || align=right | 1.5 km || 
|-id=949 bgcolor=#E9E9E9
| 465949 ||  || — || January 13, 2011 || Kitt Peak || Spacewatch || — || align=right | 1.5 km || 
|-id=950 bgcolor=#E9E9E9
| 465950 ||  || — || January 11, 2011 || Kitt Peak || Spacewatch || — || align=right | 1.4 km || 
|-id=951 bgcolor=#E9E9E9
| 465951 ||  || — || January 13, 2011 || Kitt Peak || Spacewatch || — || align=right | 2.2 km || 
|-id=952 bgcolor=#E9E9E9
| 465952 ||  || — || September 12, 2004 || Kitt Peak || Spacewatch || — || align=right | 1.9 km || 
|-id=953 bgcolor=#E9E9E9
| 465953 ||  || — || March 26, 2007 || Kitt Peak || Spacewatch || WIT || align=right | 1.0 km || 
|-id=954 bgcolor=#E9E9E9
| 465954 ||  || — || September 22, 2000 || Kitt Peak || Spacewatch || — || align=right | 2.0 km || 
|-id=955 bgcolor=#E9E9E9
| 465955 ||  || — || January 24, 2011 || Kitt Peak || Spacewatch || — || align=right | 1.1 km || 
|-id=956 bgcolor=#E9E9E9
| 465956 ||  || — || January 11, 2011 || Kitt Peak || Spacewatch || — || align=right | 1.1 km || 
|-id=957 bgcolor=#E9E9E9
| 465957 ||  || — || August 17, 2009 || Kitt Peak || Spacewatch || — || align=right | 2.5 km || 
|-id=958 bgcolor=#d6d6d6
| 465958 ||  || — || January 17, 2011 || Mount Lemmon || Mount Lemmon Survey || BRA || align=right | 1.5 km || 
|-id=959 bgcolor=#E9E9E9
| 465959 ||  || — || January 28, 2011 || Mount Lemmon || Mount Lemmon Survey || — || align=right | 1.9 km || 
|-id=960 bgcolor=#E9E9E9
| 465960 ||  || — || September 28, 2009 || Mount Lemmon || Mount Lemmon Survey || NEM || align=right | 2.2 km || 
|-id=961 bgcolor=#E9E9E9
| 465961 ||  || — || April 7, 2007 || Mount Lemmon || Mount Lemmon Survey || — || align=right | 1.5 km || 
|-id=962 bgcolor=#E9E9E9
| 465962 ||  || — || February 25, 2007 || Kitt Peak || Spacewatch || — || align=right | 1.4 km || 
|-id=963 bgcolor=#E9E9E9
| 465963 ||  || — || September 18, 2009 || Kitt Peak || Spacewatch || — || align=right | 1.8 km || 
|-id=964 bgcolor=#E9E9E9
| 465964 ||  || — || December 5, 2010 || Mount Lemmon || Mount Lemmon Survey || — || align=right | 2.4 km || 
|-id=965 bgcolor=#E9E9E9
| 465965 ||  || — || January 29, 2011 || Mount Lemmon || Mount Lemmon Survey || — || align=right | 1.4 km || 
|-id=966 bgcolor=#E9E9E9
| 465966 ||  || — || December 2, 2005 || Kitt Peak || Spacewatch || — || align=right | 1.5 km || 
|-id=967 bgcolor=#E9E9E9
| 465967 ||  || — || October 27, 2005 || Kitt Peak || Spacewatch || — || align=right | 1.9 km || 
|-id=968 bgcolor=#E9E9E9
| 465968 ||  || — || September 16, 2009 || Kitt Peak || Spacewatch || — || align=right | 1.4 km || 
|-id=969 bgcolor=#E9E9E9
| 465969 ||  || — || January 11, 2011 || Mount Lemmon || Mount Lemmon Survey || — || align=right | 1.6 km || 
|-id=970 bgcolor=#E9E9E9
| 465970 ||  || — || August 7, 2008 || Kitt Peak || Spacewatch || — || align=right | 1.9 km || 
|-id=971 bgcolor=#E9E9E9
| 465971 ||  || — || October 18, 2009 || Kitt Peak || Spacewatch || AGN || align=right data-sort-value="0.93" | 930 m || 
|-id=972 bgcolor=#d6d6d6
| 465972 ||  || — || February 21, 2006 || Mount Lemmon || Mount Lemmon Survey || — || align=right | 2.1 km || 
|-id=973 bgcolor=#E9E9E9
| 465973 ||  || — || January 16, 2011 || Mount Lemmon || Mount Lemmon Survey || — || align=right | 2.6 km || 
|-id=974 bgcolor=#d6d6d6
| 465974 ||  || — || December 10, 2010 || Mount Lemmon || Mount Lemmon Survey || — || align=right | 2.8 km || 
|-id=975 bgcolor=#E9E9E9
| 465975 ||  || — || January 24, 2011 || Mount Lemmon || Mount Lemmon Survey || — || align=right | 2.5 km || 
|-id=976 bgcolor=#E9E9E9
| 465976 ||  || — || January 16, 2011 || Mount Lemmon || Mount Lemmon Survey || — || align=right | 1.6 km || 
|-id=977 bgcolor=#E9E9E9
| 465977 ||  || — || December 8, 2010 || Mount Lemmon || Mount Lemmon Survey || — || align=right | 1.6 km || 
|-id=978 bgcolor=#E9E9E9
| 465978 ||  || — || October 18, 2009 || Kitt Peak || Spacewatch || AGN || align=right | 1.0 km || 
|-id=979 bgcolor=#E9E9E9
| 465979 ||  || — || March 13, 2007 || Kitt Peak || Spacewatch || GEF || align=right | 1.4 km || 
|-id=980 bgcolor=#E9E9E9
| 465980 ||  || — || February 7, 2011 || Mount Lemmon || Mount Lemmon Survey || — || align=right | 1.3 km || 
|-id=981 bgcolor=#E9E9E9
| 465981 ||  || — || February 12, 2002 || Kitt Peak || Spacewatch || AGN || align=right data-sort-value="0.97" | 970 m || 
|-id=982 bgcolor=#d6d6d6
| 465982 ||  || — || November 25, 2009 || Mount Lemmon || Mount Lemmon Survey || EOS || align=right | 2.2 km || 
|-id=983 bgcolor=#E9E9E9
| 465983 ||  || — || September 20, 2009 || Mount Lemmon || Mount Lemmon Survey || — || align=right | 1.1 km || 
|-id=984 bgcolor=#E9E9E9
| 465984 ||  || — || October 24, 2009 || Kitt Peak || Spacewatch || NEM || align=right | 1.9 km || 
|-id=985 bgcolor=#E9E9E9
| 465985 ||  || — || October 18, 2009 || Mount Lemmon || Mount Lemmon Survey || AGN || align=right data-sort-value="0.81" | 810 m || 
|-id=986 bgcolor=#E9E9E9
| 465986 ||  || — || September 24, 2008 || Mount Lemmon || Mount Lemmon Survey || — || align=right | 1.9 km || 
|-id=987 bgcolor=#E9E9E9
| 465987 ||  || — || September 15, 2009 || Kitt Peak || Spacewatch || — || align=right | 2.0 km || 
|-id=988 bgcolor=#E9E9E9
| 465988 ||  || — || September 15, 2004 || Kitt Peak || Spacewatch || WIT || align=right data-sort-value="0.90" | 900 m || 
|-id=989 bgcolor=#E9E9E9
| 465989 ||  || — || November 22, 2009 || Mount Lemmon || Mount Lemmon Survey || — || align=right | 1.9 km || 
|-id=990 bgcolor=#E9E9E9
| 465990 ||  || — || September 21, 2009 || Mount Lemmon || Mount Lemmon Survey || — || align=right | 1.0 km || 
|-id=991 bgcolor=#E9E9E9
| 465991 ||  || — || October 17, 2009 || Catalina || CSS || WIT || align=right | 1.2 km || 
|-id=992 bgcolor=#E9E9E9
| 465992 ||  || — || February 1, 2006 || Kitt Peak || Spacewatch || — || align=right | 2.3 km || 
|-id=993 bgcolor=#d6d6d6
| 465993 ||  || — || March 9, 2011 || Kitt Peak || Spacewatch || BRA || align=right | 1.4 km || 
|-id=994 bgcolor=#d6d6d6
| 465994 ||  || — || October 26, 2008 || Kitt Peak || Spacewatch || EOS || align=right | 1.8 km || 
|-id=995 bgcolor=#E9E9E9
| 465995 ||  || — || January 31, 2006 || Mount Lemmon || Mount Lemmon Survey || — || align=right | 2.0 km || 
|-id=996 bgcolor=#E9E9E9
| 465996 ||  || — || December 29, 2005 || Socorro || LINEAR || — || align=right | 2.4 km || 
|-id=997 bgcolor=#d6d6d6
| 465997 ||  || — || October 9, 2008 || Kitt Peak || Spacewatch || EOS || align=right | 1.6 km || 
|-id=998 bgcolor=#fefefe
| 465998 ||  || — || October 15, 2004 || Socorro || LINEAR || H || align=right data-sort-value="0.64" | 640 m || 
|-id=999 bgcolor=#d6d6d6
| 465999 ||  || — || April 14, 2010 || WISE || WISE || Tj (2.99) || align=right | 2.7 km || 
|-id=000 bgcolor=#d6d6d6
| 466000 ||  || — || October 17, 2003 || Kitt Peak || Spacewatch || EOS || align=right | 2.1 km || 
|}

References

External links 
 Discovery Circumstances: Numbered Minor Planets (465001)–(470000) (IAU Minor Planet Center)

0465